This is a list of characters in the MÄR series developed and designed by Nobuyuki Anzai.

Team MÄR

Ginta Toramizu
(虎水ギンタ Toramizu Ginta)

Babbo
(バッボ)

Babbo is a unique ÄRM, that was first wielded by Phantom and is later wielded by Ginta. It resembles a metal kendama. It contains the soul of the previous Elder of Caldia.

Babbo has many forms:

 Babbo Version 1A: Hammer Arm - Babbo becomes a gauntlet over the user's hand with a metal ball at the end. The base of the gauntlet has the same design as the hammer part of Babbo's normal form.
 Babbo Version 1B: Dagger Arm - Babbo becomes an extension for the first version where a dagger appears in the place of a metal ball.
 Babbo Version 2: Bubble Launcher - Turns into a gun that Ginta wields. This form can shoot exploding bubbles. Ginta uses this for long range attacks.
 Babbo Version 3: Gargoyle - Turns into a giant Gargoyle creature that levitates and holds a ring in his mouth, with a giant crystal as his waist. He can use the ring to fire a strong beam that uses a lot of magical power. Because this version is a Guardian ÄRM, Ginta cannot move when he uses it, but it also is very dangerous...if he is reckless with it, Ginta's spirit energy will be crushed (he may also lose his sanity).
 Babbo Version 4: Alice - Babbo turns into an angelic female Holy ÄRM that uses healing magic, which is effective for counter-attack and protection against Darkness ÄRMs. Babbo becomes embarrassed after the transformation.
 Babbo Version 5: Cushion Jelly - Turns into a giant jelly that absorbs all physical attacks used by the enemy. This form will also render Ginta motionless.
 Babbo Version 6: Puss in Boots - Turns into a larger version of Puss in Boots where he gains immense speed, has a knife hidden in one of his boots, and the ability to use ÄRM like Fresh Bonito (a strong Weapon ÄRM that resembles a fish) and Mr. Replacer (a unique ÄRM that resembles a doll that can substitute for Ginta when he is about to be attacked).
 Babbo Version 7: Unification - Can unite mind and body. Ginta used this form for his father. 
 Babbo Version 8: Reverse Gatekeeper Clown - Exclusive to the manga, Babbo turns into a form that resembles Gatekeeper Clown that allows a certain number of people to go through by the dice that it rolls. Ginta and his dad used it to go back to Earth following the defeat of Caldia's Orb.
 Babbo Version 8: Omega Gargoyle - Exclusive to the anime, Babbo turns into a golden version of Gargoyle where it is strengthened by the hopes and dreams of everyone on MÄR-Heaven.

Princess Snow
(スノウ, Sunou)

Princess Snow is the only heir to Lestava and is the counterpart of Koyuki and Dorothy's step-niece. Lestava is the capital of MÄR Heaven. Due to her appearance many people misjudge her and go easy on her, to find themselves beaten to a bloody pulp. Only her good friends seem to know of her true personality. Snow has a crush on Ginta, and is very possessive of him. Towards the end of the series, Snow's feelings for Ginta become more evident. Snow uses Ice ÄRM to fight and protect.

Snow is on the run from her stepmother with her servant and good friend Edward after the queen set out to kill her. Much later they find an abandoned castle. As they explore it, Snow decides to seal herself away in ice, despite Edward's protests. Before sealing herself away, Snow tells Edward to come back later with a Fire ÄRM to free her when he is strong enough. Edward later becomes Alan, who gives the Fire ÄRM to Ginta during a fight. When Ginta melts Snow from the ice, Snow falls on and accidentally kisses Ginta, which is both of their first kisses.

The plots in the final parts of the anime differ from the manga:

 In the manga following the War Games, Snow is connected with Koyuki due to their similarities. From when Snow was little, she talked about a different world which Diana thought was a make-believe story; though it seems Snow forgot about the different world while she grow up. Diana gave Alan an ÄRM named Monban Pierro, which summoned Danna. Diana then came to believe that the other world was not a myth and desired to take over both worlds. When Snow used her ÄRM, a 'hole' opened that connects both worlds. Even though the hole is still small with the power of both Snow and Koyuki, it's steadily getting bigger. Snow is released after Diana's death. Together with the rest of Team MÄR, witness Orb's defeat by Ginta. Ginta use the last ability of Babbo's magic stone to create Monban Pierro, returning with Danna to their world. In MÄR Omega, Snow is seen residing in her castle, being guarded by Alan.
 In the anime, Orb extracted part of Koyuki's soul as a fragment, downloaded the fragment into a special magic stone, and give it to Diana. Diana then planted the magic stone in Snow's mother and cast an ancient spell to melt that stone into a baby that's about to be born so that the baby born will be the identical in body and soul as the original. That's how Snow was made where she is an individual that's not supposed to exist in MÄR-Heaven, making a deep connection between Snow and Koyuki. Diana plans to use their connection to open a portal between both worlds. Following the War Games when Team MÄR stormed Lestava Castle, Magical Roe sacrifices his life to save Snow from the Death Cube. When the Ghost Chess came into view, she along with Team MÄR were captured. She and Team MÄR managed to escape with the help of Chaton and Loco. When King shows up in person using Danna's body as a host, Snow is killed alongside Nanashi. At the end of the anime, Snow and Koyuki became one being in order to give the magic stone that connected them to Ginta to defeat the Orb. Snow in Koyuki's body ended up staying in Ginta's world to be with him.

Princess Snow's ÄRM consists of:

 Healing Angel - A pendant Holy ÄRM that heals anyone in the vicinity of its glow.
 Ice Ring - A ring Nature ÄRM that would form an ice blade around the user's hand.
 Iced Earth - A Nature ÄRM that would fire shards of ice at the opponent.
 Snowman - A snowman Guardian ÄRM. It is nicknamed Yuki by Princess Snow. Snowman can also multiply.
 Undine - A Guardian ÄRM that summons a sentient being made of water that can create and shape water. She is voiced by Karen Strassman in English.

Jack
(ジャック, Jakku)

Jack is a young farmer who is the son of Jake and an unnamed woman. He is the one who meets Ginta early in his adventure and after the boy helps him beat the Rugelu Brothers, a pair of werewolves that were terrorizing Jack's home to claim the farm's vegetables. Afterwards, he and Ginta become best friends. Loud-mouthed and clumsy, Jack is the weakest of Team MÄR (though he is still on par with a knight), although not by any means the least resolute, if not the most: he never misses a chance on training to get stronger, first not to be a burden to others, and second, to avenge the death of his father Jake—a former soldier of the Cross Guard—who died in the first War Game at the hand of one Zodiac Knight, Weasel. He also has a hopeless crush on every cute girl he can lay his eyes on, especially Snow and Dorothy, despite the fact that Dorothy treats quite cruelly. Eventually, his luck with females changes as he gains former Rook Pano as his girlfriend. In the end of the anime, Jack lives with his mom, Pano, and the two vegetarian werewolves that now work for him. In MÄR Omega, it was mentioned that Jack is engaged to Pano. Jack is based on the main protagonist of Jack and the Beanstalk, with his name, the fact that his mom is widowed and unnamed and his association with plants (including beanstalks) as similarities. Jack also closely resembles Monta from Eyeshield 21.

Jack is a user of plant/Earth-type ÄRMs:

 Battle Shovel - Also called the Earth Scoop, it is a Weapon ÄRM that resembles a shovel. At first, the Battle Shovel was weak. Later on, Dorothy helped to upgrade it with some magical stones.
 Kikazoku Fire - A Guardian ÄRM that resembles an Arabian midget with fiery hair that can perform fire attacks.
 Mehitos - A Guardian ÄRM that resembles a carnivorous plant. Like Snowman, Mehitos can multiply.

Dorothy
(ドロシー, Doroshii, "Dorothy Gale") 

The beautiful 16-year-old Princess of Caldea who is also a witch of immeasurable power, and the younger sister of Diana: Queen of Chess Pieces (the former princess of Caldia). She is the step-aunt of Snow (although she and Snow have some trouble accepting this) and thus, she bears the responsibility to put a permanent rest to Diana's actions in accordance to the laws of their birthplace, the magic kingdom Caldea. Dorothy has an interest in stealing any uncommon ÄRMs she comes across (which is also a duty she performs on Kaldea's behalf), heaping up into a wide variety for her collection, but she seems to prefer Guardian ÄRMs and Wind-themed ÄRMs in battle. Dorothy's moods can vary from the sweet, kind-hearted girl to the pitiless, cruel fighter who could kill her enemies without any second thought. She also has a notably large crush on Ginta, leading her to smother him with attention, much to Princess Snow's dismay.

Dorothy and four components of her ÄRM (Scarecrow, Toto, Flying Leo, and Ring Armor) are allusions to The Wizard Of OZ.

Dorothy's ÄRM consists of:

 Andarta - A Dimension ÄRM that allows Dorothy to teleport to anywhere that she has previously been.
 Antidote Tonic - A Holy ÄRM used to cure poisons.
 Broom of Zephyrus - A Nature ÄRM that takes the form of a metal broom that is always seen near Dorothy. Besides using it as her mode of transportation, Dorothy can shape the wind with it.
 Crazy Quilt - A Guardian ÄRM that takes the form of a loud-mouthed whimsical puppet with dirty clothes and no legs.
 Flying Leo - A Guardian ÄRM that summons a flying lion.
 Ring Armor - A common Guardian ÄRM that summons a living suit of armor that is often used to test an enemy's strength.
 Ring Dagger - A Weapon ÄRM that Dorothy uses when she does not want to use her Broom of Zephyrus.
 Rock Giant Golem - A Guardian ÄRM that resembles a giant suit of rock armor. It originally guarded Babbo until it was defeated and ended up in Dorothy's possession.
 Scarecrow - A Guardian ÄRM that takes the form of a scarecrow whose hat can turn into a drill.
 Toto - A Guardian ÄRM that takes the form of a Rain Dog (a three-tailed dog) that can eat absolutely anything.
 Watching Bird - A Dimension ÄRM that takes the form of a purple hummingbird that can send a hologram of what it sees back to the user where it is shown on the ground.
 Zipper - A Dimensional ÄRM that summons a zipper that Dorothy uses to store her extra ÄRM.

Alan
(アラン, Aran) 

A hardened (smoking) warrior, the powerful human who participated in the previous MÄR-Heaven War against the Chess Piece, known as the 2nd man, Danna's partner in the Cross Guard. His power level is said to be equivalent to a Knight in the method of power ranking used by the Chess Pieces, and once fought to a draw with the Knight's third in command, the one ranked directly under the No.1 Knight Phantom, Halloween. It is later found out that he and Halloween were once childhood friends, back when the latter's name was Pump. However, because of a curse set by Halloween's Darkness ÄRM Igneil in the same fight, Alan was sealed inside the court guardian and custodian dog of princess Snow, Edward. In order to change back into Alan, Ed has to sleep three times, often forcibly knocking himself out, which is too risky and inconvenient for most situations. If Alan sleeps once, he becomes Ed again. After the visit from Phantom and his Zodiac Knights, Alan and Ed are split apart into two beings by Ginta, using Babbo's Alice transformation. Due to his time inside Edward, Alan has developed a fear of cats. In the end of the anime, Alan lives with Chaton, Babbo, and the baby Loco.

Alan's ÄRM consists of:

 Air Hammer - A set of rings and bangles Dimension ÄRM and Alan's most frequently used weapon. It uses an attack called "Air Freeze" that creates blasts of air shaped into concussive blasts and compensates for Alan's lack of ranged attacks.
 Bumoru - A Guardian ÄRM in the form of a rude, fat woman with a bear tail and ears, used to help people the Training Gate train, and to navigate for them. She's referred to as 'the ugly one.'
 Flame Dragon - A flame Nature ÄRM, this is the natural counter to Snow's ÄRM and is able to conjure fire in any form. This is what he uses to light his cigars.
 Merilo - A pendant Guardian ÄRM in the form of a polite, slender girl with a cat tail and ears, used to help people the Training Gate train, and to navigate for them. She's referred to as 'the cute one'. Although she does have cat attributes, Alan is not allergic to her because she is an ÄRM.
 Saint Anger - A Guardian ÄRM. Incarnating Alan's fists of justice and expanding an even wider reach, these armour hands that descend from heaven thunder earth with its deliverance of god's punishment to all sinners.
 Shadowman - A Nature ÄRM that can create a being out of a persons shadow, this copy has the same magical powers and skills as the person on what it is based.
 Training Gate - A Dimension ÄRM that Alan used to train Ginta, Snow, Jack. and Dorothy. It puts people at the user's will inside this gate, where time slows to 1/60th of its outside time and with many challenges programmed within it, the dimension serves good training ground. The drawback to using this ÄRM is that Alan cannot go inside the Gate himself and he cannot move while he uses it.

Alviss
(アルヴィス, Aruvisu, "Alvíss") 

The cold figure of MÄR, Alviss is the one who brought Ginta into MÄR-Heaven. He joined the Cross Guard in the 1st War Game and grew fond of their leader, Danna, with whom he shared the very same goal for which they put their lives at risk, to fight the Chess and protect MÄR-Heaven. This pure courage, however, got Alviss further than he could ever have expected in his wildest dreams: Phantom also chose him as one who would reside in the dreary future of MÄR-Heaven, in the form of a Zombie-tattooed undead.

Alviss, not wanting to live as an immortal, makes it his life's goal to defeat Phantom. A superior in the Cross Guard, Gaira, recognizes this and trains Alviss. When Alviss finally succeeds in defeating Gaira in a wooden sword fight, Alviss is rewarded with two ÄRM: Gate Keeper Clown, and 13 Totem Pole. While training, Alviss also befriends a fairy named Belle. From then on, Belle is almost always seen in Alviss' company outside of battles.

For years, Alviss lives under the looming shadow of this most unwanted tomorrow, and recluses from opening his heart to others. However, after meeting with Ginta, Alviss starts to change and finally stands up, facing destiny at his full height.

Alviss is first introduced sending Ginta Toramizu to MÄR-Heaven. Alviss then searches for the one brought to MÄR Heaven, only to find out that it's a child with no magical power. Alviss then turns Jack into a bird and tells Ginta he will destroy Babbo, which angers Ginta. Ginta immediately fights Alviss, but Ginta stands no chance and quickly loses. Alviss, however, releases Jack and does not kill Babbo. Alviss follows Ginta and his allies around until they reach the War Games, where Alviss enters as a member of the Cross Guard. Alviss is the only member of the Cross Guard that made it past the preliminaries.

During the War Games, Alviss forms a rivalry of sorts with Rolan of the Chess Pieces, and the two battle twice: once in the 3rd round, where Alviss loses, and again in the final round, where Alviss emerges as the victor. Part of their rivalry is due, in part, to both of them owning a Zombie Tattoo, however, unlike Alviss, Rolan is happy to have received one.

In the anime, following the War Games, Alviss' Zombie Tattoo is awakened by the Ghost Chess, bringing Alviss under Phantom's control. After confronting former allies in Team MÄR, Alviss manages to resist the Zombie Tattoo and leave Phantom. Alviss later returns, however, to destroy Phantom. Rolan confronts Alviss in order to him from destroying Phantom, but realizes Phantom is leaving his world soon and attempts suicide instead. Unbeknownst to Alviss, Rolan survives. Phantom then appears before Alviss and willingly allows Alviss to kill him. When Alviss finds himself unable to, Phantom uses Alviss' weapon to perform the death strike on himself, freeing Alviss from the Zombie Tattoo.

After Phantom's death, Alviss, along with the rest of Team MÄR, are confronted by the Chess Pieces' King. Like most of the other members, Alviss dies fighting the King. Once the King is defeated by Ginta, however, Alviss is brought back to life. At the end of both the manga and anime, Alviss and Belle live together.

Alviss' ÄRM consists of:

 13 Totem Pole - Guardian Mode - Alviss's main attacking ÄRM, a chain Guardian/Weapon ÄRM. Guardian mode causes many giant totem poles to erupt from underground. They can also separate to fire individual sections at the opponent.
 13 Totem Pole: Rod Mode - Alviss's main attacking ÄRM, a chain Guardian/Weapon ÄRM. Its Rod Mode is a Weapon ÄRM staff made of 13 sections of the totem pole. Given to Alviss by Gaira.
 Á Bao A Qu - Though the name is a direct reference to the mystical monster of Malaysian legend, the summoned form of this bracelet Guardian ÄRM is thoroughly inspired by the renown space fortress of Mobile Suit Gundam. Once arisen, its asteroid "jaw" and "checkbone" will cleave, opening the Á Bao A Qu's "eye". Its gaze will then take in the sights of foes and jail them in a glass ball, detonating from within.
 Caged Bird - A Darkness ÄRM that traps someone inside a cage and turns that person into a bird.
 Gatekeeper Clown - The Dimension ÄRM that brought people from other worlds to MÄR-Heaven, broke after fulfilling its purpose. It has also been stated during its first appearance it determines the number of people who can come though by the roll of a dice. However, it's already broken when Alviss summons Ginta to MÄR Heaven.
 Guardiss - A ring Weapon ÄRM that creates a large shield with a cross on it.
 Purific Ave - The Holy ÄRM Alviss ever had which was given to him by Ginta. The Purific Ave is the only ÄRM that is capable of killing Phantom.
 Sealing Skull - A Darkness ÄRM, causes the target to become paralyzed while seeing images of frightening skeletal phantoms. As its "price" for use, it causes the user excruciating pain.

Nanashi
(ナナシ, Nanashi) 

Nanashi was found by Galian in the middle of nowhere, lying alone and nearly dead due to a nasty wound in his stomach. After he was revived by him and taken to the bandit Guild of Luberia, it turned out he had no memory of his past or even his name, and thus Galian named him Nanashi (nameless). Galian would later betray Nanashi, joining the Chess Pieces and leaving him in charge of Luberia after erasing his memory of him. Nanashi's main goal is to track down the Chess Piece responsible for wiping out Luberia (Peta) and avenge his slain allies. Though through all his seriousness in killing Peta and avenging his comrades, Nanashi still has time for flirting. It's also implied that Nanashi is from Earth, because Babbo says he has the same scent as Ginta, his unusual strength while fighting Oruko and his knowledge in how to make takoyaki which does not exist in MÄR.

Nanashi's ÄRM consists of:

 Aegis - An aspis etched with the carving of a white maiden, this Holy ÄRM lives up to its title of "god's shield", with the ability to most effectively guard its user from physical assaults, and refuel him with magic power.
 Andata - A Dimension ÄRM that transports Nanashi and all he wishes to any place that he has already been to, stored in its memory.
 Crystal Balls - A Dimension ÄRM. This ÄRM can show in real time events occurring in any place Nanashi wishes.
 Electric Eye - A ring Nature ÄRM which produces bolts of lightning that Nanashi fires at his enemies. Everytime Nanashi uses this ÄRM, he sees a shadowy outline of Galian.
 Griffin Lance - A ring Weapon ÄRM that takes the form of a lance with griffin-headed tip.
 Gymnote - A Guardian ÄRM. Passing from inside Caldia's vault into Nanashi's possession, summons a giant, pink, eyeless electric eel to crush and or electrocute Nanashi's enemies.
 Thousand Needles - Weapon ÄRM, a necklace that creates giant spikes from the ground to attack the user's enemies.

NOTE: It is heavily implied that Nanashi is Joker from Nobuyuki Anzai's previous manga Flame of Recca because of his appearance somewhat matching Joker's (during the SODOM story arc) and the wound to his stomach (because Joker was impaled in his stomach before he created a black hole which sucked him in) possibly leading to MÄR. Joker is never seen again after he was sucked in the black hole. This has not been officially confirmed by Nobuyuki Anzai.

Chess Pieces
 is a fictional organization in the manga and anime series and plays the role of the main antagonist faction. It is a military faction which, over the 10 years it was in existence, has established supremacy over the rest of its rebellious kind in MÄR-Heaven; its notoriety for being the predominantly antagonist organization enjoys a prestige of such the name of Chess Pieces has become a taboo for generations to come. This organization's home to people from a mélange of backgrounds with a mixture of motives: discarded humans seeking a refuge, victims of social injustice wishing to avenge themselves upon their antagonists, radicals aiming to 'cleanse' the current MÄR-Heaven, or simply lusters of wealth, power, women, ÄRMs or war; all united under the same goal: to conquer the world. The Chess ranks are based on the pieces in the game of chess with rank going from king down to queen, knights, bishops, rooks, and pawns, separating the hierarchy into two parts. Its top is governed by the command force of one King and one Queen, which lurks in darkness most of the time the identity of its two members privy almost to none outside the Chess Pieces; headed by the Queen Diana. Second to it is the combat force consisted of echeloned Knights (elite fighters, leading operation executors), Bishops, Rooks and Pawns (foot soldiers); headed by the no.1 Knight Phantom. Chess members from Rook ranks upward is permitted the possession of class earrings (which are actually Dimension ÄRMs that allow them to communicate with other Chess Pieces, like the Cross Guard's are) and individual masks. Although the rudimentary rule for ranking one is based on their power (proved by mastery of ARMs or in less usual cases, impressive feats), it's also noted that soldiers of lower ranks can be stronger than their superiors.

Members

King
(キング, Kingu) 
Top class of the Chess Pieces, accessible to Queen class only.

Caldia's Orb

Caldia's Orb is an orb formed in Caldia, the island of magic users, to contain the most evil of evils, and thus was locked away in Caldia's floating palace. After influencing both Phantom and Diana with its thoughts, Caldia's Orb was freed by the two, and the three together formed the Chess Pieces with the Orb as King. The Orb entered Babbo for Phantom to use as a weapon, and after Phantom's death possessed Danna's body as a new host with which to control the Chess Pieces. While awaiting Phantom's revival, the Orb concocted a plan to conquer both MÄR-Heaven and Earth alongside his Queen. Caldia's Orb's only thoughts are those of pure malevolence, though, he hates the human race for such sins as well. The true form of the evil that is the Orb is an eyeless corpse wielding a scythe, a perfect form for something of such impurity. The anime shows the Orb having other abilities, such as strangling enemies without touching them in a manner similar to The Force from Star Wars, and immediately killing those who touch its deadly aura. The Orb, following the defeat of Phantom, decided that all of the Chess Piece soldiers, outside of itself and Diana, were useless pawns and massacred all of them, the only survivors being those who already abandoned the Chess. The next step to total victory the Orb devised was the annihilation of Team MÄR, killing all of its members outside Ginta and Jack. Following Diana's defeat, the Orb challenged Ginta and revealed its form of Danna. Though at first discouraged to fight his father's body, Ginta eventually managed to use Babbo to draw the Orb out of his father and put Danna's soul back in its rightful place. In the manga, the Orb then entered Babbo and battled Ginta, who entered Babbo as well, and was defeated right there, its remains a magic stone for Babbo. In the anime, the Orb escapes to Earth and begins wreaking havoc. Eventually, Ginta returns to Earth and, using the collective willpower of his friends (include the dead comrades) in MÄR-Heaven, summoned a golden Gargoyle to ultimately destroy the Orb. In both versions the Orb's final words were to warn humanity that one day all life will be destroyed by their own hands.

The ÄRMs of Caldia's Orb consists of:

 Explode - A Nature ÄRM that takes the form of a semi-circular glass ball that encloses its prey and explodes.
 Gigant Blade - A giant sword Weapon ÄRM with its handle run into the spine of its heavily spiked blade.
 Phoenix - From within the sacred flame of its cyclical rebirth, this Guardian is summoned to fight by the King's side and consume all his opponents in flame.
 Raijin Goyles - A Nature ÄRM that takes the form of two gyrating wheels of air that King launches at his opponents.
 Tiamat - Answering King's behest, the fallen mother goddess with her retained mythological appearance emerges from legend to bring retributions upon all those who rebel him.

Queen
(クイーン, Kuīn) 
Second most powerful class of the Chess Pieces. The Queen insignia is a Queen-piece earring.

Diana
(ディアナ)

Diana is a former citizen of Caldia, the island nation of witches and wizards off the Southern Continent of MÄR-Heaven. Very little is known about her time in Caldia, though from what is known Diana and her sister Dorothy belonged to an aristocratic wizarding family. It was Diana who trained Dorothy to use the ÄRM Zephyrus Broom, as indicated by a flashback in the anime, and it is also possible she was its original wielder. It is also known that she made dolls for Dorothy and repaired them when they were broken, one of which became the Chess Pieces Knight Pinocchio. While to Caldia and her little sister, she was a caring figure and a well-liked citizen. Dorothy says that Diana insatiably coveted nearly everything since a young age. It is also known that, fourteen years before the series, Diana snuck a Magic Stone into Lestava's queen, giving birth to Snow and giving her a connection to Koyuki. Diana's quotes in the manga, however, make it apparent that Snow's connection with Koyuki was formed through other events. 10 years before the series, motivated by an immense craving for power, she began to discard her loyalty to Caldia. After releasing Phantom from Caldia's cell, the two unsealed the Orb which the sorcerers held under imprisonment and stole 798 ÄRMs (including Babbo, which they downloaded the Orb into). They then fled Caldia to the outside world.

After 2 years of wandering, Diana was chosen as Lestava kingdom's royal bride, with Lestava's king wishing for a new queen for the sake of Snow, who was saddened by the death of her mother, and the two instantly got along like a true mother and daughter. During her rule of Lestava, Diana was respected by residents of the palace as a kind-hearted queen, because her malice was so well concealed. In secret, Diana was also enthroned as Chess Pieces' Queen, being one of the founders, and granted Phantom the title the no. 1 Knight. She also branded him with a Zombie Tattoo, which grants the wearer eternal life, as a reward. With the uprise of the Chess Piece army, she moved on to the next step of her plan to conquer MÄR-Heaven: creating the Cross Guard, presenting them all with ÄRMs for weapons, with the other-worlder Danna for leader. Understandably, she was acknowledged as the one who walked MÄR-Heaven to victory, a position from which she could achieve her true goal - domination over Ginta Toramizu's world, wishing to use their advanced weapons and technology to defeat the much less developed people of MÄR-Heaven. With the king falling ill, Diana began to show her darker side, constantly ordering more delicacies, ÄRMs, and also began to order Lestava's army to conquer new territory. As more and more suspicious characters developed around Lestava Castle, Alan, one of Lestava's strongest knights and the Cross Guards second-in-command, led Snow to safety outside the castle. Diana is initially sinister, selfish, and uninterested in anything as long as those of a lower rank can do her biddings without fail.

As the Chess Piece Queen she is one of the two heads of a twin-headed snake commanding the Chess army, made Lestava Castle a safe haven for the army, and shaping MÄR-Heaven into a land of war and destruction. Remaining in the background at all times, Diana pulls the strings of the Knights, using them as her ultimate weapons for her plan to conquer both MÄR-Heaven and Ginta's world. Unknown to anyone else, including herself, Diana's true self is still locked away inside of her, clouded by the influence and manipulation of the King, which was not reminded to her until the very end. Diana is introduced fairly late into the storyline, during the second round of the War Games. During that round she meets with Phantom and Peta, discussing the progress of the war and Team MÄR.

During the War Games, it is shown she watches the battles from Lestava Castle, through her own personal, and overlarge crystal ball. Diana later reappears after Dorothy's battle with the Knight Rapunzel, who reveals to Dorothy how Diana is the Chess Pieces' Queen. Diana gives an order to Phantom to lead a large number of Rooks into Caldia and steal all of the remaining ÄRMs, coincidentally the same time Team MÄR visits Caldia. Phantom, however, calls back the invasion following his battle with Ginta, surprised by how Ginta wounded him and deciding to immediately report this to his Queen. Diana, too, is impressed by how Ginta has grown, and realizes that soon he will become a great threat. Diana later orders Magical Roe to capture Snow in a battle against her in the 6th round of the War Games, which he does reluctantly. With Snow in her possession, Diana's plan to take control over both worlds began to fully bloom, watching the other world through the eyes of Ginta's mother. Following Phantom's next battle with Ginta, which ends in Ginta's victory, Diana scolds Phantom for losing and casts him away as a useless and outdated weapon.

Dorothy later takes on Diana which ends with Dorothy successfully killing her. She does regain her loving personality before she dies.

Diana's ÄRM consists of:

 ??? - An unnamed Nature ÄRM that conjures purple slime that surrounds a person and turns them into a slime monster. It only appeared in the anime.
 Aeros Staff - The scepter Weapon ÄRM mere possession of which symbolizes Diana's supremacy and which manifests the power she holds, having the blood of Dorothy's veins run in hers - wind mastery.
 Cerberus - Invoking her choker Guardian ÄRM, Diana conjures three voids which upon contact will release the chain binding this Netherworld monstrosity that resembles a dog with 2 snake heads on its shoulder.
 Dalia - Named for the Lithuanian goddess of fertility, this belt Ghost ÄRM fuses Diana's body with wings and claw in resemblance to a harpy.
 Death Cube - A Darkness ÄRM which locks a person inside a fluorescent Rubik's Cube. It's designed to open only when the cube is solved (which must be dealt with extra meticulosity), and is fail-safed to claim the riddle solver's life afterwards. It only appeared in the anime.
 Octopus - A Guardian ÄRM that takes the form of a gigantic octopus.
 Pinocchio II - A Guardian ÄRM that resembles a giant remade version of her puppet Knight Pinocchio in ÄRM form.
 Ring of Ends - A Nature ÄRM that creates poisonous wheel of mists. It only appeared in the manga.
 World Tunneler - An unnamed Unique ÄRM tat forms a large bubble that engulfs human beings. When it engulfed Snow, it used her connection to Koyuki to open a portal between the two worlds.

Knights
(ナイト, Naito) 
In the Chess combat force's hierarchy, Knights are top members highest ranked for their powers. The number of Knights is strictly within 13, making up the alias Zodiac Knights (ゾディアックのナイト, Zodiakku no Naito) - each Knight has a Zodiac constellation correspondence, with the 13th as the number one Knight, Phantom. Each Chess Piece dubbed as a Knight would have an insignia earring (the knight piece in a chess game) bestowed upon him/her, usually by Phantom. There are two unnamed members that were only shown in episode 69, their positions were probably taken over by Rolan and Chimera as they died in the First War.

Phantom
(ファントム Fantomu)

The leader of the Knights, Phantom was born thirty years before the main part of the series takes place in the magical island nation of Caldia within MÄR-Heaven. At age ten, while exploring Caldia's Floating Castle, he discovered Caldia's Orb, a magical orb in which was sealed the consciousnesses of the world's greatest evils. Seduced by the orb, he began to visit nearly every day until discovered by the guards and is discreetly sentenced to death at the hand of his parents by Caldia's laws. Unwilling to do so, however, they committed suicide (by hanging in the manga, and with a knife originally intended for their son's murder in the anime). Because of this, Phantom, having no other relatives, was imprisoned for life. Phantom's reactions to his parents' decision differ in the original version and anime adaption: in the manga, he regards it as an act of profound love towards their son, while in the anime he rejects it as a wish forced on him which ultimately ruined his life and only accepts it as a form of love when reminded by Candice's love at the end of his existence.

Being the primary villain throughout most of the story, although he appears suave on the outside, Phantom is sadistic, callous and like other Chess Pieces, revels in bloodshed and destruction. He especially likes to be entertained at all times, hoping during each Great War that a strong enemy will appear and trying his best to make each battle as enjoyable as possible, even to the point of allowing Ginta's power to grow equal to his. As opposed to the main protagonists, who respect life and unite in their love for MÄR-Heaven, he considers humans vile, rotten and above all, seeks emancipation from their transient lifespan with its natural weaknesses by means of immortality. Despite this, he appreciates certain human values such as courage.

As the Chess Pieces' de facto commander, Phantom rules the four classes with an iron fist, tolerating no cowardice in his men or even haphazard killings of lowerclass members. At the same time, his charisma elicits great love and respects from many of his followers, i.e. Rolan, Peta and Candice. Later in the story (more obviously shown in the anime than the manga), Phantom's revealed to treasure those who are close to him, and his desire for eternity partly originates from his unwillingness to part with them. On occasions, he openly laments his solitude in their passings: his parents, Alma, and in the course of the War Game, his best friend Peta.

After another 2 years, the Chess Pieces gathered enough power to wage war against MÄR-Heaven and Phantom, in command of its thousand fighters, quickly suppressed every opposing force. In reply, the kingdom of Lestava, MÄR-Heaven's sovereign superpower, incorporated a mass of worldwide fighters into a retaliating army, the Cross Guard. The Chess Pieces, in an attempt to fight off the Cross Guard, then initiated the War Games. During the last round of the War Games, Phantom and Danna fought to a draw; both of them ended up dead. Phantom's body is buried in a graveyard known to the Chess Pieces only, visited by Peta every year.

10 years later, Phantom was rescued by Diana, and out of mesmerization with her beauty and convictions, became her faithful follower. They stole 798 ÄRMs from Caldiaa's vault and Babbo (with the Orb's soul downloaded into it), then deserted Caldia for a journey across MÄR-Heaven, recruiting warriors for the army they called Chess Pieces. In 2 years' time, Phantom befriended Peta and fell in love with Alma, a Vestrian sailor - until Diana was chosen as the bride of Lestava kingdom and enthroned herself Queen of the Chess Pieces. With the mantle of Chess Pieces' number 1 Knight and the completion of its construction falling onto Phantom, Diana bestowed on him the Zombie Tattoo, making him unkillable and thus, undefeatable. This, however, resulted in the wane of Phantom's romance: while he was infatuated with immortality and believed it would deliver him of the flawed, limited human existence, Alma sought the opposite, respecting its constant cycle of death and rebirth. Seeing the disharmony, each took their own leave and Phantom set out on another journey to assemble brethren whose ideals were akin to his.

When Ginta defeated Phantom in the final rounds of the second War Games, Candice carried Phantom's body away back to his room. Diana was not happy that Phantom lost and cast him aside. Only Candice, Rolan, and the Ghost Chess remained loyal to Phantom. Phantom met his demise when Alviss inserted the Purific Ave into the hole on his chest.

Phantom's ÄRM consists of:

 Allu Majuu - A Unique-typed ÄRM in the shape of a fiendish flame orb chained to a black halberd. When ordered, the orb will enlarge itself and engulf opponents, killing them in a deadly explosion.
 Hexagonal Shards - Another Unique-typed ÄRM, a mass of hexagonal fragments. In its defense mode the fragments construct an impenetrable shield, and when discharged in attack mode they will launch consecutive shoots at the target. When inactive, these are kept along Phantom's sewed on arm, giving the effect of scales.
 Phantom Cannon - A Unique-typed ÄRM that releases blasts of energy from his palm. The beam is extremely powerful and nearly destroyed Babbo's Puss in Boots form. It only appeared in the anime.
 Phantom Glass - A Unique-typed ÄRM, a mirror which traps opponents inside it and shatters after a short amount of time (presumably coherent to the victim's magic level in the manga, while works on a mechanism with an hourglass in the anime) sharing the trapped ones a same fate. Phantom also uses this to kill cowards in the Chess Pieces.
 Soul Infinitia - A ghostly Darkness ÄRM that takes the form of a darkly colored ribbon. After draining the life force of all around it besides the user, it launches itself at its master's intended target.
 I (Eins) - Guardian ÄRM, the sentient type, a knight-armored creature which attacks with a long spear. Destroyed during his battle with Ginta. It can be said Eins is the strongest of the five guardians Phantom summoned at once.
 II (Zwei): Remrace - Guardian ÄRM, the insentient type, one of the only two to be named and strongests - a Herculean version of these common dark souls. Destroyed during his battle with Ginta.
 III (Drei) - Guardian ÄRM, the insentient type, a muscularly built wood monster. Destroyed during his battle with Ginta.
 IV (Vier) - Guardian ÄRM, the insentient type, a four-legged puppet with its head twisted upwards. Special ability: crossing space. Destroyed during his battle with Ginta.
 V (Fünf): Dead Dragon - Guardian ÄRM, the insentient type, one of the only two to be named and strongest. It resembles a dragon with decaying skins and reeky breath. Destroyed during his battle with Ginta.
 VI (Sechs) - Guardian ÄRM, the insentient type, a gigantic stuffed rabbit with a sewn mouth which, each time it opens, will release a destructive beam. Destroyed during his battle with Ginta.
 VII (Sieben) - Guardian ÄRM, the sentient type, a Humpty Dumpty-like midget, donning an outfit of late 18th/earlier 19th century style (as its top hat and cane suggest). Not much of its ability is known but it can be said Sieben as the weakest as seen when he tried to run away rather than fight. Destroyed during his battle with Ginta.
 VIII (Acht) - Guardian ÄRM, the insentient type, a rock monster. Destroyed during his battle with Ginta.
 IX (Neun) - Guardian ÄRM, the insentient type, a levitating cloaked monster with invisible gloved hands and a log for a head. Destroyed during his battle with Ginta.
 X (Zehn) - Guardian ÄRM, the sentient type, a hooded skeletal phantom which assails the opponent emotionally. Special ability: once the opponent falls for its words, X's outwardly harmless appearance will transform into a more malignant one and finishes the prey. Destroyed during his battle with Ginta.

Peta
(ペタ)

Very little is known about Peta's early background. At some point he would befriend Phantom, a Caldian outlaw and eventually the strongest Knight, some point before Phantom received the Zombie Tattoo. Shortly before that Peta witnessed the breakup of Phantom and his lover, the Vestrian Alma. At some point, apparently after Alviss, Peta would receive Phantom's Zombie Tattoo, wishing to walk the path of destruction together for all eternity. After the formation of the Chess Piece army, Peta quickly gained Knighthood and became the Knights' strategic officer. Peta, however, did not fight in the previous War Games, choosing instead to broadcast the battles throughout MÄR-Heaven.

After Phantom's death in his fight with Danna, Peta was initiated as the Chess army's leader until Phantom's eventual resurrection, as he explained to the Cross Guard. At some point during his leadership, Peta would meet Eileen, a woman ripped to shreds from torture, and accepted her into the Chess Pieces, granting her forbidden Ghost ÄRM to make this task easier. Under Peta's tutelage, Eileen, from then on known as Chimera, would one day rise to the rank of Knight. It is also known that Peta would commonly send in thieves to the Cave of Babbo, locked inside of which was Phantom's former ÄRM, in an attempt to gain possession of Babbo and resurrect Phantom.

Peta is one of MÄR-Heaven's darkest and most mysterious figures. Usually calm and intelligent, Peta knows just the right amount of effort needed to put into anything, and is also sly and cunning. Peta is, literally, a very bloodthirsty figure, and has a habit of drinking the blood of others in a skull-emblazed wine glass. Like other Chess Pieces, Peta shares the view that humans are worthless beings. Peta is also one of Phantom's most loyal followers, and is subject to any of Phantom's beliefs. Phantom himself admits that he considers Peta his friend.

Peta was responsible for causing the massacre at Luberia's fort which made him a target of Nanashi. When it came to his fight with Nanashi, Peta was killed by Nanashi who used his Griffin Lance on him. Phantom arrives and obliterates Peta's body as he bids him farewell.

Peta's ÄRM consists of:

 Abyss Cannon - A Ghost ÄRM where tortured souls are called from hell and fired at the enemy as a mouthed cannonball.
 Blood Body - A Nature ÄRM which recreates the body of the user into blood, thus immunizes it against all physical attacks.
 Blood Syringe - A Unique ÄRM where spiked glass orbs are created and launched at the victims. If they hit, they will drain blood from the target until they burst, at which point the blood flows at the master of the ÄRM. The user can then Coagulate the blood into different weapons, including bladed stones to throw at the living enemies.
 Body Eye - Peta's opera necklace Guardian ÄRM which calls forth upon earth a wingless Diablo with runic bonds sealing its lower half. However, the demon does not possess any satanic extraordinary. Its power manifests in a myriad of bats while Body Eye itself wrecks massive destruction with its hands.
 Chain Soldier - A Guardian ÄRM that summons several armored soldiers linked together with chains used to ensnare Peta's enemies. However, the soldiers are useless without their chains. It only appeared in the anime.
 Dark Reflector - A Dimension ÄRM. In the manga, a round mirror which bounces attacks back away from the user, while the anime pictures it as a portal which absorbs the attack and then blasts it back in the caster's direction.
 Garnet Claw - A Ghost ÄRM. It is a set of razor-sharp blood-colored claws that are made from the users fingernails.
 Magic Mirror Ring - A Dimension ÄRM, used to record something then allow him to broadcast it over any/multiple reflective surfaces (even the moon and Sun) or through other communication type dimension ÄRMs. This is how people watch the War Games when the fighting takes place somewhere else. Strangely, even after Peta's demise the battles are broadcast throughout MÄR-Heaven.
 Sickle Death - A Weapon ÄRM that resembles a scythe engraved with a gory vulture's head.

Halloween
 Adult Halloween 
 Child Halloween 

 is the third strongest Knight and the third in command, losing out to Peta only for the latter's intelligence. Halloween was abandoned as a child by his parents, who gave him the name of Pump, and was often bullied by other children in his town. During his childhood, Pump also developed a penchant for dismembering small animals, such as dogs. Despite this and the town's disliking towards him, Pump's childhood friend, Alan, still remained friends with him. One day, however, Alan showed Pump an ÄRM that creates flames. Attracted to it, Pump thieved the ÄRM, murdered the children who bullied him, and left the village, but not before telling Alan they would always be different people. At some point, Pump joined the Chess Pieces and taking on the title of Halloween where he would chain himself to a cross ÄRM and would eventually rise to the rank of Knight. As fate would have it, Halloween would fight Alan, who had joined the Cross Guard, and the fight ended in a draw. Even today Halloween still holds a deep hatred for Alan inside of his crippled heart.

Halloween is a most sadistic character, taking enjoyment in the pain and sufferings of others. Like other Chess Pieces, Halloween takes enjoyment out of slowly killing his enemies in battle. A lover of war and bloodshed, Halloween is often put in charge of Chess Piece operations, particularly major invasions. Halloween has a fancy for punishing lower-ranked Chess Pieces, as seen with him enjoying the mental torment of Ian when informed about the upcoming punishment of his lover, Gido. When Ian threatens to escape and murder Halloween, Halloween responds by mockingly wishing Ian really was strong enough to kill him. Halloween's love of torment and punishment extends even to his fellow Knights, commonly making death threats to Rapunzel should her greed get out of hand. Several times he is the pun of a joke about tomatoes because of his mask, which is mistaken for a tomato, earning him the nickname "Tomato Head" from Alan. Deep inside, however, Halloween is still the cowardly child he was when under his former name, as pointed out by Alan.

Halloween first appeared to inform Loco and Ian that the mission to kidnap Snow had been canceled. Following a rampage through the port city of Vestry alongside Chimera, Halloween punished Ian by sentencing his lover, Gido, to torture. Just prior to the War Games' 3rd Round, Halloween gives Pozun the order to enter Alan into the War Games. Alan and Halloween at last had the confrontation they'd been waiting for during the final round of the War Games. During the fight, Halloween goes on a killing rampage among the audience members by sending Alan blows he can easily dodge only for them to hit the audience. After Alan willingly takes each attack Halloween sends, Halloween reveals his identity of Pump, much to Alan's horror. Halloween goes on with the battle, hoping that Alan will eventually succumb to him and leave the defenseless audience vulnerable. Alan, however, no longer holds back and manages to wound Halloween. Halloween responds by unleashing his Guardian, Wanka Tanka, which nearly manages to kill Alan if Alan had not unleashed the Guardian he got in Caldia, Saint Anger, to destroy Halloween's. Defenseless, Halloween is then picked up by Alan's Guardian, thrown, and punched skyward. With Halloween being thrust into the sky to unknown whereabouts, Alan is named victor with Halloween's apparent demise.

Halloween's ÄRM include:

 ???? - Nature ÄRM, an unnamed bracelet ÄRM that creates flames formerly belonging to Alan during his childhood, Halloween having stolen it.
 Antares - Nature ÄRM, creates balls of flame of multiple sizes used to throw at the enemy.
 Cross Dagger - Weapon ÄRM, the very cross tied to Halloween's back, that turns into, and shoots missiles of flame. Edited into a pole in the American dub.
 Flame Hand - Nature ÄRM which is used to create hands for Halloween, since he got himself tied to the cross.
 Grave Hail - Darkness ÄRM, crosses, with several eyes and mouths on them, which shoots up from underground, similar to Alviss' 13 Totem Pole's Guardian style. Edited into polls in the American dub. In the anime this ÄRM instead summons several coffins, with the same eyes and mouths, which open up to reveal skeleton warriors to do Halloween's bidding.
 Igniel - A Darkness ÄRM. Although specific details are unknown, it basically merges two living creatures together, as seen with Alan and Edward. Its apparent side effect may be decrease of age, or deformity.
 Napalm Death - Weapon ÄRM which grows a large blossom from the back of Halloween's cross that shoots flames like a cannon.
 Sticks of Fire - Nature ÄRM, two sticks with the tips on fire that shoots blasts of flame at the enemy, held by Halloween using Flame Hand. Left unnamed in the manga.
 Trick-Or-Treat - A Guardian ÄRM that creates explosive plant creatures with Jack-O-Lantern heads.
 Wakan Tanka - A Guardian ÄRM. Though embodying the "divine sacred", summoning through Halloween's cross pendant ÄRM has minimized the "Great Spirit"'s omnipotence to the giant form of a winged skeleton-bodied skull, albeit retains some of its ascendancy - the scorching flame it breathes.

Chimera
(キメラ Kimera, "Chimera")

Real name Erin, her appearance, masked or unmasked, is generally anomalous for her gender. She usually dons a ghastly skeletal mask with a green wig attached to it, concealing her blonde hair color (the green color is possibly exclusive to only the anime, however, as the cover of volume 13 shows a blonde-haired masked Chimera). She was about to marry an ex-Chess Piece, but villagers disrupted the wedding and seized and murdered her fiancé. The villagers then capture Chimera herself after revealing to her that they murdered her fiancé. Chimera is tortured for days in hopes that she will reveal the location of the remaining Chess Pieces. She finally escapes, only to find that her body is deformed due to the torture she endured like a scar across her face and missing her right eye. She is recruited to the Chess Pieces by Peta, who offered her a Ghost ÄRM. Since her enlisting for the Chess Pieces she's fashioned her hair spiky, a mode far more commonly styled for males, and (exclusively for the anime) builds up her stature into a more masculine form, misleading people about her actual gender. In addition to these extraordinary outward features, Chimera's facial appearance carries hideously unique traits: she wears a grotesque mass of eyeballs on the side of her face to replace her lost eye, stitches a horizontal black line on the scar across her nose's bridge, and seasons the overall gruesome sight by piercing her Knight insignia earring on the tip of her tongue.

Out of the 13 Zodiac Knights, Chimera is by far the most mysterious. In her every seldom appearance until the Final Battles of the War Games, Chimera never takes off her mask, nor is she seen conversing with anyone in words. Always shielding her emotions behind the skull face, Chimera possesses the silence of a beast, and also the humanity of one: she's ruthless in battles, and is a barbarous warrior, once seen ripping apart a Cross Guard soldier thrusting at her. Her savagery is commended by even the 3rd-in-command Knight Halloween; and her prowess is hinted to be one of the most noteworthy among the Knights: Alan of Team MÄR once remarks he did not notice her in the 1st War Game, which allegedly implies either she moved up to the 4th seat of the Chess Zodiac in a matter of only 6 years' times from a previous unknown lower rank, or that she entered the Chess after the 1st War Game and managed to occupy it after only 6 years (which was precisely the case). Pozun, referee of the War Game, too esteemed surviving a fight with Chimera - be the fight itself a loss- as an impressive deed (even when the survivor in question is Gaira, 3rd-in-command of Cross Guard, the Chess' nemesis in the 1st War).

When stripped of her mask, Chimera's personality is shown to be an overly sarcastic and scornful one, reflected in the jeers she attributes to others, e.g. Gaira whom she outfought, and Dorothy when her attacks were merely sufficient enough to land her but one blow. She's also resolutely resentful of the world, claiming she will never forsake her path of destruction, War Game or not; and refuses to decline herself to be sympathized by opponents. Besides killings, Chimera appears to have interest in disfiguring the bodies of (pretty) woman, hints at having an entire collection of it. Despite all this fiendishness, Chimera still has her own emotional insecurities, being easily irritated/incited to losing concentration.

In the final round of the War Games, Chimera faced off against Dorothy where Chimera's true form was revealed. Dorothy managed to defeat Chimera who then escapes. Ian pursues Chimera in order to get revenge on the transformation that she performed on Gido. Their fight did not last long. Before she dies, Chimera gives Ian the ÄRM that would undo Gido's transformation. Chimera was reunited with Marco in the afterlife.

Chimera's ÄRM consists of:

 Chimaira - Far surpassing its monstrous mythological origin, this Ghost ÄRMs drill-handed body synchronizes with Chimera's insanity to bring into existence a demon of monstrosity beyond belief.
 Four-Eyed Fish - Guardian ÄRM, summons 4 eyed grotesque flying fish.
 Ghost Eye - A unnamed Ghost ÄRM, that gives the user a large number of eyes on side of their face which Chimera used to replace the right eye that she lost when she was tortured. Whether or not this has an actual purpose is unknown, it does reflect Chimera's Inhumanity. This was one of three Ghost ÄRMs Peta gave to Chimera.
 Ghost Tail - Ghost ÄRM, a sharp rag tail.
 Howling Demon - Ghost ÄRM, turns the user's hand into a salivating stretching monster's mouth which shoots energy. This was one of three Ghost ÄRMs Peta gave to Chimera.
 Hydra - A Ghost/Guardian ÄRM that merges the user with a serpentine monster. From the darkest thread of legend this immemorial demon is brought forth and, merging with her deteriorated sanity, manifests a creature of such even Chimera would dread. It only appeared in the anime.
 Monster Arm - An unnamed ring Ghost ÄRM. Turns the user's hand into a stretching skeletal dinosaur-headed arm with needle sharp, canine teeth. This was one of three Ghost ÄRMs Peta gave to Chimera.
 Ogre Hand - Ghost ÄRM, turns the user's hands into long, gangly, multi jointed giant clawed stretching arms.

Rolan
(ロラン Roran)

At some point early in Rolan's childhood, Rolan's parents died to unknown circumstances, leaving a poor and starving Rolan to live on the streets. Rolan was always ignored by the others, and Rolan himself would have died under such a living eventually. At one point, a number of kids stealing food bumped into Rolan and left a large amount of food around him, leaving the owner of the stolen food to blame Rolan and severely abuse him, putting Rolan in an even worse state than before. Just after this, Rolan was found by Phantom, the leader of the Chess Pieces. Phantom became the only one to treat Rolan with kindness, giving him food to survive.

Just before Phantom left, he asked Rolan if he would follow him, which was followed by Rolan taking Phantom's hand and the two walking out of Rolan's home village together. Rolan, having a wish to serve Phantom, would join the Chess Pieces. According to Alan, Rolan fought in the first War Games as a Rook.

Girly behaviour, stuttering speech and possessing a Zombie Tattoo, Rolan of the Knights class is Alviss of Team MÄR's direct counterpart. The one prime difference between them is that while Alviss' feeling for Phantom is sheer hatred, Rolan's is love, keeping him Phantom's company on the path to eternity. This is incomprehensible to others, given Phantom's fearful figure, but understandable for him, as Rolan once experienced Phantom's considerate side. He does not like to fight unnecessarily, as seen in episode 29, but will do anything Phantom asks of him. In the final episodes of the series, Rolan is sent to retrieve Alviss by Phantom but is shocked to find his friend and Candice have seemingly abandoned him and in sadness he tries to commit suicide by stabbing himself through the throat, but is seen alive in the last episode.

Rolan's ÄRM consists of:

 Ailes'd Angel - The flocks of feather Nature ÄRM that adorn Rolan's right shoulder which wing him for mid-air combats. The wings can shoot out an endless stream of razor-sharp feathers.
 Cockatrice - The bell Guardian ÄRM at the end of a chain seen at Rolan's waist that calls for the giant eagle of legend and its lethal petrifying breaths. The ÄRM requires an esoteric incantation to activate.
 Dark Cage - Another unique ÄRM type, sends out a giant bird cage to trap opponents. This may be a downgraded version of Alviss' Darkness ÄRM Caged Bird.
 Dark Ribbon - Nature ÄRM, ties adversaries in one fatal grip with the roots of the Dark Roses, which weaken them by sucking out their energy. It only appeared in the anime.
 Electric Cage - The unique ÄRM type, summons a cage inside which the trapped one cannot use ÄRMs, and will take on an immense electric jolt at each attempt to get out. It only appeared in the anime.
 Rapier Whip - A Weapon ÄRM, a sword that can stretch its blade like a whip and explodes when its tip touches an opponent. The anime also shows it having the ability to split to create more arms to use as whips. In the manga, it was destroyed in his battle with Alviss in the final rounds, but the anime shows him using it after this battle.
 Stone Cube - Rolan's Nature ÄRM which makes giant stones cubes to crush the enemy or explode with him/her. He can also make a snake out of magma using this ÄRM:
 Magma Snake - Using boulders and lava flowing around, the user creates a giant snake from the Stone Cubes.

NOTE: It is possible that his personality is that of Roland from the epic poem, The Song of Roland. Roland is depicted in the poem as heroic, brave, and amazing. In reality, he was just that, so it could be that Rolan of the Chess Pieces' personality is derived as the same of that of Rolan from the epic poem.

Weasel
(ヴィーザル Vīzaru, "Víðarr")

Weasel is the oldest of the Knights (84 years old), but nevertheless a nimble fighter. He is easily distinguished due to his eccentric appearance with a tree growing out of his head containing all his magic power, and always seen holding a wood cane inside which he hides all his ÄRMs. As a Chess Piece he's wicked, but is overall an amicable figure to his Chess fellows, and is civil enough towards his opponents.

In the 1st War Games, Weasel fought Jack's father, Jake and grasped victory using his Guardian Bird of Rotten Wood, leaving Jake fatally wounded (and dying at his home shortly thereafter, which was unknown to Weasel). He plays little to no role in the 2nd War, save for once in the War campaign when he took over Henli castle by his trees, and like most of the Chess Pieces spends the War Games observing the fights. He takes special notice of Jack since his debut of victory, for the boy also masters his wood element and uses Jake's memento scoop. He fights Jack in the final round of the 2nd War Games and is defeated by him, who used Kikazoku Fire to burn the tree on his head, eliminating the source of his power. Weasel compliments Jack by telling him that he has surpassed his father after his defeat.

Weasel is a plant Guardian ÄRM user and the ÄRMs in his possession consist of:

 Bird of Rotten Wood - Guardian ÄRM, a bird born with wooden structure of such blighted plant that will wither any greens to its own bleak figure.
 Bomb Grass - A Nature ÄRM which summons a strange kind of exploding plants.
 Deadly Field - A Darkness ÄRM, used to wither all the plants around the users, with the exception of the tree on top of Weasel's head.
 Floating Leaf - A Nature ÄRM, a large leaf that is used by the user to float in the air.
 Seed Cannon - A Nature ÄRM summoning cannons to fire fruits and vegetables as bullets.
 Yggdrasil - A Guardian ÄRM which calls out an enormous, invincible tree. Weasel can control various parts of the tree for an attack. In the anime, it feeds on the suffering of others to grow very large.
 Dance of the Leaves - An attack of Yggdrasil, many leaves launch themselves towards the enemy and cuts them.
 Snaky Bow - An attack of Yggdrasil, grows large 'snakes' out of the tree's branches used to attack the enemy.

Ian
(イアン)

On the surface, Ian appears to be a laid-back, jovial young man who (even when he was still a low-ranked Rook) is one of the few Chess Pieces to have the nerve to be blunt and disrespectful towards his superiors. For example, Ian would snap back at Halloween who is one of the highest-ranked Knights, and in his quest for vengeance later on, challenging even the Knights. Ian's amiable manners, however, belies the lethal, battle-thrilled fighter he can be in the battlefield. Once driven by determination he is relentless in his pursuit, be it a simple case of getting the fight he enjoys or the venture to eliminate a superior sworn enemy. Ian's tenacity is prone to lead him go against his orders, and Ian admits because of it, he is always mentally prepared for death penalty.

Although his affiliation evidences the contrary, Ian is a man of high morals - in fact, it was his idealistic dream to purify the world instead of selfish desires like most other Chess Pieces that urged him to join it in the first place. He cares for his girlfriend, Gido, deeply: his love for her outweighs his ideals and well-being, and later becomes his motivation in battle throughout the series. His upright nature attracts great respect from his opponent, Ginta, and though the sympathy does not align their causes, it eventually manages to diminish their initial enmity.

In the War Games arc, after Chimera, the culprit that victimised Gido by turning her into a worm, is defeated by Dorothy, Ian chases after her in an attempt to avenge his girlfriend. Eventually, after Chess is disbanded, Ian manages to track Chimera down and kills her. Ian then takes one of Chimera's Arms which allows him to recover Gido's original self. Afterwards, the couple takes refuge in a nearby village in fear of being killed by Chess haters, which coincidentally, is also the same village where Ash takes refuge in. After Ginta defeats Caldia's Orb, Ian and Gido settles in the village where they took refuge in happily ever after.

Ian's ÄRMs consist of:

 ÄRM Break - A Weapon ÄRM when activated various weapons sprout forth from Ian's body or clothes.
 Demonic Bond - A ring Darkness ÄRM which creates a chain binding the user and the opponent, used to wear out both's magic by draining their blood. If either the opponent's or user's magical power completely runs out, their life will be taken and the match will be over.
 Iron Maiden - A ring Darkness ÄRM that takes the shape of the Iron Maiden upon summoning. Anyone who touches the Iron Maiden, or who is bound to it, will be unable to use Holy ÄRMs.
 Moon Fall - A Weapon ÄRM that creates multiple crescent-shaped blades and the user throws them at the opponent.
 Octopus - An 8-armed whip Weapon ÄRM with regenerative ability. After his training in the Shuuren no Mon, he upgrades it into a more deadly weapon with various forms, the Octopus 2.
 Octopus II - Weapon ÄRM, a more powerful version of Octopus with various sharp weapons at the tip of each tentacle.
 Peryton - A ring Guardian ÄRM from which Ian calls forth the mutated hybrid of legend possessing greater prowess than its said origin is depicted.
 Python Whip - A pair of Weapon ÄRMs that are snake-shaped whips. By concealing these in the long sleeves of his clothes, Ian is able to quickly strike with them before his opponent can see them, serving good confusion.

Magical Roe
(マジカル・ロウ Majikaru Rou)

Magical Roe is a clown directly under Queen Diana's command during her reign in Lestava. When Diana's stepdaughter Princess Snow was little, she cried often and it was during one of those times that Diana introduced Lou to her. For her entertainment, he always demonstrated many circus tricks and as they grew close, became her favorite babysitter and childhood friend. However, later the two parted ways, at an unknown point in Snow's life and under unknown circumstances.

Magical Roe was present at Phantom's revival. In the 2nd War, he was seen with Phantom and the other Knights after the 3rd Round. Magical Roe reappeared in the War Games and fought Snow herself in the 6th round (secretly obeying Diana's order to kidnap Snow) and told Snow that he did not join the Chess Pieces, he was with the Chess Pieces to begin with. He did manage to play around with Snow as a way of tiring her down. While struggling with the thought of betraying his princess himself, Magical Roe still proceeded with his mission and eventually managed to take Snow back to the Lestava headquarter, winning the Game fight by default. After the War Games' Final Battles when Team MÄR stormed Lestava Castle, he fought off Nanashi, Alan, and Gaira to prevent them from reaching Snow and ended up defeated, regretting his actions. In the anime adaption, instead he fought Alan and Ginta, and after his loss, Roe sacrificed his life to save Snow from Diana's Darkness ÄRM, atoning for his wrongdoings towards the princess.

Magical Roe uses circus-themed ÄRM which consists of:

 Blade Ball - A Weapon ÄRM that creates a ball with sharp blades extending from it.
 Bubble Lion - A Nature ÄRM that resembles a bubble hoop creating lion-shaped bubbles to attack.
 Fire Wheel - A Nature ÄRM that create flame hoops to attack the target. Destroyed during his battle with Snow.
 Mimic Medallion - A unique ÄRM that mimics the ability of an opponent's ÄRM (i.e. summons the same Guardian his opponent's ÄRM calls, but their power differ in accordance to the user's power).
 Nightmare - A Guardian ÄRM that creates many eyed, sharp-toothed spherical objects which fly around and attack.
 Trump Soldier - A Guardian ÄRM that creates card soldiers. Outlines of these soldiers can be seen in the background of the cover spread of the first chapter.

Galian
(ガリアン Garian)

Galian is the former leader of the notorious thief guild Luberia, founding it as a sanctuary for the lowest of the world. As a leader he was an amicable figure and well loved by his subordinate thieves, and led Luberia in a peaceful reign - until the 1st War started. The birth of a homicidal Chess Pieces army begot disasters and destructions all over MÄR-Heaven, which, while seen as a bad thing for 'business' by many Luberians, set Galian on constant agitation, eager to test his power. His first encounter with the Chess was inside a havoc-wrought castle they occupied, and after defeating many Pawns, Galian faced the strategist Knight Peta. Although Galian was easily worsted, Peta still acknowledged his great potentials and let him go after provocatively advising him to invest his power in a worthier place.

The 1st War Games concluded with the Chess' defeat, however that did little to help Galian's already triggered infatuation with their immense power. Predicting the Chess' inevitable return, he resolved to abandon Luberia and joined the Chess. During that time he found and saved a wounded man with no memory of his past life, but nevertheless endowed with latent might, whom he named Nanashi. Turning a deaf ear to his thieves' suspicion and cool reception towards Nanashi, Galian took Nanashi under his wings. To help him win Luberia's heart Galian sent a monster to the guild's fortress, which Nanashi outfought and earned him the respect of many, just like Galian wished. After that he trained Nanashi and when he was strong enough, he left his throne and the Electric Eyes ÄRMs, symbols of Luberia's leader to Nanashi, erased all memories regarding him and went to Peta to accept his previous offer. Over the years, his name also faded from Luberia's memories itself as the thieves recognized Nanashi as their true leader.

Although Galian severed all his ties to Luberia when he gave up on it, the news of Luberia's extermination (along with its ragged flag), brought to him by the perpetrator Peta himself, comes as a great personal blow, though he denies it by setting fire to the flag. Knowing Nanashi's nature and his reaction to this homicide, Galian anticipated the man's participation in the 2nd War Games and entered it thus, to prove he had chosen the right path. With Phantom's approval, he revealed himself to Nanashi in the 5th round after Ash's defeat and the two battled, Nanashi's memories of him gradually returning. He's defeated by Nanashi and compliments him for having become a fine leader, admitting his envy. At the end of the series, Nanashi and Galian rule Luberia together.

Like Nanashi, he fights with lightning-themed ÄRMs:

 Electric Feather - A ring Weapon ÄRM that creates feathers which emit electricity.
 Electric Saucer (AKA Electric Frisbee) - A Nature ÄRM consisting of electrified frisbees that Galian uses to circumnutate his opponent. This ÄRM has an electric power that attacks and inhibits the opponent.
 Hiraiken (AKA Lightning Rod Sword): A Nature ÄRM that resembles a sword which absorbs lightning. If enough is stored, it will emit electricity.
 Magic Rope - A Weapon ÄRM that resembles an urn containing ropes which tie the opponent. These ropes can keep coming after their target even after being cut and the only way to stop them is to destroy the urn. It is shown in the anime that Galian must possess at least two of these.
 Memory Eraser - A Darkness ÄRM which erases memories.
 Torpedine - A ring Guardian ÄRM that summons a giant stingray with a mouth on its back that fires bolts of incredibly high voltage lightning at Galian's foes.

Ash
(アッシュ Asshu)

Ash is easily distinguished by his mask: a grim reaper skull with its tongue sticking out. Ash joined the Chess Pieces in the hopes on using their immense power to conquer the world, ending all other wars countries might bring up, preventing the deaths of the children he loves. Ash's personality is rather unusual on Chess Piece standards, being both playful and fun-loving. Ash prefers to solve matters without fighting, urging the other knights during a meeting not to deal with Rapunzel's insolence. Phantom himself, who is one of the Knights' more sadistic members, states that he could never hate Ash, as he is "just that sort of person". Ash is almost always seen enjoyably playing with children, usually Defu, Ko, and Benni, three children he rescued from the war, when not fighting a battle. Ash is also very willing to take punishment, sometimes volunteering to be punished when he felt he did something wrong. Galian also states that Ash is usually not one to give up in battle. Ash's original design had little differences from his final one, the most notable being having a regular mask rather than a skull one.

Ash is first introduced revealing to Nanashi that an opponent, Galian, requests that Nanashi appears in the fifth round of the War Games, and also states to Ginta Toramizu as wish to fight him as well. During the fight, Ash chooses to use his Psycho Space on Ginta, claiming that he does not want children to see the rest of the battle. Once inside, when Ash reveals he joined the Chess Pieces to save the children he loves, and Ginta, angered, responds by yelling at Ash that the Chess Pieces would only kill those children by their own hands. After Ginta defeats Ash's Guardian, Ash gives up the fight, and tells Ginta that he supports Ginta's wish to save MÄR-Heaven. Ash, Defu, Ko, and Benni later watch Ginta's battle with Phantom together, and leave once Phantom is defeated.

Ash, along with most other Chess Pieces, later is called for a meeting by Diana, and there Diana has King kill all of them, though Ash escapes. While leading survivors of the war to safety, Ash meets up with Ian and Gido, who themselves are escaping the Chess Pieces, and together the three search for Ginta while also closing various portals between the two worlds. Once they reunite with what remains of Team MÄR, Ash reveals to them King's plan to conquer both worlds. As Ash and Ginta close another portal later that night, King attempts to stop them, though Ash locks him in his Phsyco Space. The two then have a short battle, ending with Ash's death. Like others killed by King, Ash is revived following his death, and still allows his friends Ian and Gido to live with him.

Ash's ÄRM consists of:

 Death - A pendant Guardian ÄRM which conjures for Ash a goalie-masked monster with ability of his likes - the ability to separate its body.
 Eingang - A ring Dimension ÄRM which emits a beam Ash uses to fill the gap connecting Earth and MÄR-Heaven. It only appeared in the anime.
 Psycho Space - A ring Dimension ÄRM, creates a different dimension that cuts off the opponent's magic in half.
 Shadowman - A Nature ÄRM that allows Ash's shadow to attack his enemy. Ash can also use this to absorb attacks meant for him.
 Split Parts - A pendant Dimension ÄRM, allows the user to split his body to attack in different directions. When Ash first uses this, it freaks out all the members of Team MÄR.
 Walking Bomb - A Weapon ÄRM that resembles a bomb that enlarges itself every time a participant of the fight gets wounded and ignites when it gets large enough.

A sadomasochistic woman that wears an eyepatch over her right eye who relishes physical pains in a fight as pleasures. Before joining the Chess, Candice was a mercenary officer, and was feared by many for her violent and abusing personality. After a defeat by Phantom however, Candice fell in love with Phantom and followed him. Though this remains largely a non-reciprocal passion, Candice still endeavours to undertake many demanding tasks (e.g. taking on powerful enemies) to get Phantom's commends, and is resolute to obliterate whoever obstructs his way.

Candice first appeared during Phantom's revival and informed him that Queen Diana summoned him. During the Chess Pieces' war campaign, Candice single-handedly defeats the soldiers at Castle Geirelulu using Gorgon to turn them into stone. Candice reappeared during the 5th Round of the War Games and fought to a draw with Jack. After Phantom's defeat, Candice accompanies Phantom to Lestava's castle, and in the manga witnesses his death while he rests on his throne. In the anime Candice tries to help him escape from the pursuit by Team MÄR in the end of the Ghost Chess attack. Though this ends unsuccessfully, it deeply touches Phantom and partly lets him die in peace, knowing he after all is not so hated. Her last appearance is with the revived Rolan, visiting Phantom's grave.

Candice's ÄRM consists of:

 Boulder Axe - A large stone axe Weapon ÄRM.
 Boulder Claw - With this Nature ÄRM Candice creates two giant sets of stone claws over her real hands that she attacks her opponent with.
 Boulder Fang - A Nature ÄRM that launches sharp rock shards from under her enemies.
 Boulder Crush - Candice buries her opponent under the shards produced by Boulder Fang.
 Gorgon - Fairly returning Candice's painstaking masochisms, her pendant ÄRM evoke the awake of a giant Gorgon head and slowly petrifies to all whom its gaze beholds.
 Grand Boulder - A Nature ÄRM which creates giant boulders.
 Kukan Teni - A magic stone embedded into her maimed right eye that she uses as a Dimension ÄRM in order to exchange her position with another one.
 Lamia - From its river dwelling, the alluring nymphs answers Candice's seek for aid with its lyre's enchanting melody, and should the situation warrants, with force far more destructive.
 Scale of Blessing - A scale in the shape of a clock, used to measure the injuries her body takes and change them into enormous magic power to summon her Guardian ÄRM.

Pinocchio
(ピノキオン Pinokion)

Smallest of the Knights, Pinocchio was once a marionette made by Diana for her little sister Dorothy when Dorothy was a child, and was apparently animated to life upon joining the Chess Pieces. In the 6th round, he was ordered to defeat Dorothy if he wished to become human. Like his namesake, his nose grows when he lies, but it transforms into a cannon after about three lies and can be used to shoot his opponents. In the War Games at the Mushroom Field, he is ripped apart by Dorothy's ÄRM Toto with his remains salvaged by Chaton by the end of the 6th Round.

In a filler episode, he was rebuilt with wagon wheels. Alongside Kouga and Girom, they ambushed Dorothy, Ginta and Alviss where Pinocchio destroyed Dorothy's Andarta at the time when Babbo gets cracked. After being repelled, Diana then sent them to capture Caldia's Grand Elder only to be defeated by Dorothy and Ginta. Also in the anime, they were last seen riding Kouga's Kung Fu Frog somewhere.

Pinocchio is a Weapon ÄRM user with his ÄRM consisting of:

 Fastitocalon - A Guardian ÄRM that creates a giant whale to attack his foes. Those who are swallowed, save for the cursed Poko, ultimately die and are dissolved down to the bones thanks to its slimy digestive juices.
 Saw Blade - A Weapon ÄRM. Creates 3 saw-like swords Pinocchion can use as weapons.

Rapunzel
(ラプンツェル Rapuntseru, "Rapunzel") 

Rapunzel is the older sister of Girom. Their father died early of an illness, after which their mother became deranged and physically abused the siblings on a daily basis. Gradually driven to their limits, one day Rapunzel and her brother finally broke down and chopped their mother to death, then ran away. The scar of this matricide survives into her adulthood: Rapunzel grows up to be bloodthirsty, arrogant and riotous (to the irritation and exasperation of many Knights), and appears to share with her brother Girom (notably the only one she holds dear and is gentle with) a love for killing women. Despite being quite far from most visions of beauty herself, Rapunzel is shown to be helplessly narcissistic and looks down on everyone, men or women, as obnoxiously ugly.

Rapunzel was present at Phantom's revival, and in the campaign of the 2nd War Games, she was responsible for the siege of Reginrave castle. Besides being with Girom watching the match between Ginta and Garon, Rapunzel was only seen outside once with the rest of the Knights after the 3rd Round. She persuaded Phantom to let her and Girom fight in the 4th Round. When someone on her team loses to Team MÄR, she challenges the loser of her team to a game of Rock-Paper-Scissors and ends up decapitating them if they lose. After Ginta defeated Girom, Rapunzel wanted to fight Ginta only for Dorothy to step in. She loses to Dorothy in the 4th round of the War Game.

It was not after the 5th Round of the War Games that the deserving retribution was delivered: as punishment for slaying her comrades without his approval, Phantom has the Rook Ian battle and kill her (by decapitation in the manga and by incineration in the anime) in battle in front of Girom's eyes and usurp her Knighthood.

Rapunzel's ÄRM consists of:

 Hair Master - A Nature ÄRM allowing her to manipulate her already odd hair, turning it into several very sharp and hard, tentacle-like drills - an obvious pun on the name Rapunzel.
 Ice Spikes - A Nature ÄRM which creates several streams of giant icicles along the ground. It can also be used to make a sort of bear trap out of two spiked walls.
 Spike Sandwich - After creating walls of ice spikes in the ground on either side of her opponent, Rapunzel flips the walls upward like the jaws of a bear trap, killing them.

Kouga
(コウガ)

Weakest and the largest of the Knights, Kouga is sensitive about his ugliness, due to which as a child he was always treated miserably. He's extremely arrogant and dense, and hates anyone with good looks, especially Alviss. He thinks people with good appearances carry dark hearts. Although his magical powers and ÄRM strength are more along the Bishop class, Kouga obtained his Knight status thanks to his vast amount of strength and a sturdy stamina which takes in unusually low damage from the most destructive of attacks.

Kouga appears cloaked throughout most of the series until the War Games' 6th round, wherein he fights Alviss and loses.

In a filler episode of the anime, he teams up with Pinocchio and Girom to attack Dorothy, Ginta, and Alviss. After being repelled, Diana then sent them on a mission to kidnap the Caldian Grand Elder and is later defeated by Dorothy and Ginta. He is last seen (in the anime only) somewhere with Pinocchio and Girom riding Kung Fu frog.

Kouga is a user of ninja-themed Weapon ÄRMs which consists of:

 Centipede - A Weapon ÄRM that turns into a huge centipede attached to the user's hand to attack.
 Daimonji - A Weapon ÄRM that forms a giant, five-bladed shuriken. Kouga uses this in hand-to-hand combat.
 Kung Fu Frog - A Guardian ÄRM that summons a huge red frog to attack with martial arts. Its speed is said to be in the top class among Guardians.
 Sand Hell - A Dimension ÄRM that creates quicksand around his opponent's feet.
 Smokescreen - A Nature ÄRM which creates gray mist that can hide almost anything, even magic power.

Bishops
(ビショップ, Bishoppu) 
The Bishops are the second-strongest group of the Chess Pieces after Knights. Each of the Bishops wears a bishop earring as an insignia; designed like a shield with a cross rather than the actual piece in chess.

Chaton
(シャトン)

Chaton is a kitty girl and the strongest of the Bishops. Chaton is always happy, almost to an annoying level. She has a comical, yet entirely serious, crush on Alan, much to his distaste as Alan, ridiculously in contrast to his looks and due to a twist of his situation with Edward, is a cat phobic. She is a good friend with Loco, even though Chaton is quick to get on Loco's nerves. Chaton deeply cares for Loco and constantly looks out for her well-being, though this usually tends to annoy Loco. Chaton first appears in the 6th Round of the War Games and Alan was surprised at her appearance when she removed her hooded robe. She quickly manages to defeat Alan (who mistook her for a Knight before the battle began) due to his Cat phobia, which he inherited from Edward. During Halloween and Alan's battle, Chaton and Loco kept arguing over who would win while watching from a castle balcony. During Phantom and Ginta's battle, after Ginta's Puss in Boots was introduced, Chaton commented that it is "the greatest Guardian ever", making her the only one who took it seriously. In the anime, after the War Games are completed, she and Loco, while traveling through the desert, get captured by the Ghost Chess along with Team MÄR. Working together, all of them escape the Ghost Chess, although due to Loco's constant use of Darkness ÄRM Loco is reverted into a baby. Chaton is quick to begin taking care of Loco, and later watches the death of Alan to King, much to her horror. During Alan's last moments, he gives Chaton his earring and she seeks out other Chess Piece members and interrogates them on King's current location. After King is defeated, Chaton lives together with Alan and Babbo, who help take care of Loco.

Her ÄRMs include:

 Bururu - A ring Guardian ÄRM that summons a giant bulldog.
 Cat Teaser - A ring Nature ÄRM in the form of a cat-toy shaped which allows the user to play puppeteer with his/her opponent's body.
 Nyan Nyan Wave - A ring Nature ÄRM that creates a powerful blast.
 Para Claw - A ring Weapon ÄRM in the form of a powerful set of cat claws that paralyze the opponent.

Hamelin
(ハメルン Hamerin)

Hamelin is one of the top three most powerful bishops. He faces off against Alviss in the fifth round of the War Games. He lost when Alviss used his Sealing Skull on Hamelin's Guardian ÄRM which immobilized both of them and then sent them flying with his 13 Totem Poles.

Hamelin's ÄRM consists of:

 Bolino - A pendant Guardian ÄRM that summons a giant monster with a bat-like face.
 Charm Horn - A clarinet Weapon ÄRM that makes copies of user.
 Hyper Wing - Nature ÄRM that places wings on its user.
 Soul Flute - Weapon ÄRM. It is a flute that saps the magical power of the user's opponent when he or she hears the music played on it.

Emokis
(エモキス Emokisu)

Emokis is one of the top three most powerful bishops and faces Princess Snow in the fifth round of the War Games. Emokis is very plump and thinks she is beautiful (she is also very sensitive about her appearance). In the end, Emokis is defeated by Snow.

Her ÄRMs include:

 Dandalcia: A guardian ÄRM that is in the shape of a sword and has a face that can speak. Emokis asks the ÄRM if she is pretty which Dandalcia always says she is (although he is lying). In the end, an enraged Emokis destroys it when it finally admits that Snow is superior in looks.
 Flower Fortune Bomb: When Emokis pulls off a petal after every time she asks, 'Is she ugly or not?', the target loses some hair in pain. After all of the petals are removed, an explosion triggers on the opponent.
 House of Cake: When Emokis summons this ÄRM, a giant candy house falls from the sky in which she eats. The more she eats, the bigger and more powerful she becomes.

Girom
(ギロム Giromu)

Girom is a psychotic boy about Ginta's age who enjoys killing, particularly women, much like his maniac older sister, the Knight Rapunzel. This is largely due to the tremendous stress from their childhood abuse from their mother, whom they later killed. He was present at Phantom's revival, along with the Knights and several other Chess Pieces. He and Orco attacked Vestry during the Chess Piece's war campaign, under the order to search for a certain ÄRM. While searching the boat at the cave's end, he quickly meets up with and fights Ginta, who defeats him using Gargoyle.

Girom was seen with Rapunzel observing the fight between Ginta and Garon. Girom then showed up in the 4th Round of the War Games, where he killed Aqua after her tie with Nanashi. As he wanted, Girom had a rematch with Ginta, and Girom almost won, due to Ginta's anger of him killing Aqua. Babbo later calmed Ginta down, however, and Ginta defeated Girom with Gargoyle, to which Girom also survived. He later witnessed his sister killed by Ian in battle as punishment for her killing of her teammates in the 4th Round.

In a filler episode of the anime, he along with Kouga and Pinocchio attacked Ginta, Dorothy, and Alviss at the time Babbo was cracked. Ginta barely survived his battle with him. After being repelled, Diana sent them to kidnap the Kaldea Elder to which Ginta and Dorothy come to rescue him. He is last seen (also in the anime only) with the two somewhere riding Kung Fu Frog.

Girum is a user of ice-based Nature ÄRMs which consists of:

 Argo-Thalos - A Guardian ÄRM, summons a sphere-shaped chunk of ice that shoots energy beams at the enemy. He uses this when he attacks Caldia. It only appeared in the anime.
 Crevasse - A ring Nature ÄRM that creates a giant crevice beneath targets and plunges them through its endless depths.
 Egola - A ring Guardian ÄRM that summons an ice giant to attack the user's enemies. This giant's power increases in areas covered in ice. Destroyed by Gargoyle.
 Iced Earth - A ring Nature ÄRM and Girom's signature ÄRM, used to fire shards of ice at the enemy. Some translations refer to this ÄRM as Ice Doors, due to the Japanese pronunciation (凍らされた地球 Āisudo Asu/Āisu Doasu).

Garon
(ガロン)

Garon Rodokin is the Chess Piece who fought Ginta in the first round of the War Games and the father of Leno and Pano. He is an honorable man who is large and is always barefoot. During the first round of the War Games, Garon faced off against Ginta and gave him a hard time in battle. Ginta ends up sparing him (partly due to intervention by Pano) after Babbo's Gargoyle form broke his ÄRM. He was killed by King, but was revived when King was defeated.

He uses Nature ÄRM which consists of:

 Body Hardener - A Nature ÄRM. It is a ring that hardens one's body. Garon has five of these.
 Stronger Body - A Nature ÄRM. It is a ring that enhances one's strength. Garon has five of these.

Kollekio
(コレッキオ Korekkio)

Kollekio is a Bishop who resembles a goblin in a jester outfit. He fought Jack in the fourth round of the War Games and used his Magic Hammer to shrink Jack. Jack was able to defeat Kollekio by making his beans grow in Kollekio's body. Rapunzel did not take Kollekio's defeat lightly and challenged Kollekio to a game of Rock Paper Scissors. Kollekio lost and was slashed to death by Rapunzel.

Kollekio's ÄRM consists of:

 Magic Hammer - A hammer Weapon ÄRM that when it hits its targets, it will reduce their size to bean's size.
 Slowpoke - A ring Darkness ÄRM which can make someone unable to move with the side effect of the caster gaining temporary blindness.

Aqua
(アクア Akua)

Aqua is a pretty girl wearing a sea-themed ball dress. Despite being a Bishop of the Chess Pieces, the happy and rather unpredictable Aqua always keeps a smile on her face, much to the surprise of Team MÄR. Aqua refers to everyone with honorific suffixes in the Japanese version.

Aqua appears in the 3rd round of the 4th Battle. After witnessing several examples of how Rapunzel kills any losing Chess Pieces, Nanashi and Aqua fight each other where Nanashi defeats Aqua with his Electric Eye. Nanashi however pretends that attack removed all of his energy in order to make the fight a draw in an attempt to save Aqua. Although Rapunzel is not happy about this, Aqua wins Rock Paper Scissors against her. Despite that, Girom then impales Aqua as he sinisterly laughs "Too bad, I played rock." Her final words were an apology to Nanashi.

After Rapunzel was defeated by Dorothy, Nanashi floats her body into the water as a burial.

She uses sea-themed ÄRM which consists of:

 Akko - A Guardian ÄRM used by Aqua that summons a mobile giant clam. Unlike most Guardian ÄRMs, Akko allows the user to still move while summoning it.
 Skate - A Weapon ÄRM (true name not stated in the series) that creates ice skates on the user's feet. She only used this once, drawing a target for Supikara.
 Supikara - A crown Nature ÄRM in the shape of a spiral seashell. By blowing in it, the user can call on sea creatures to aid in battle. Aqua wears Supikara on her head.

NOTE: Her character is based on The Little Mermaid.

Avrute
(アヴルートゥ Avurūtu)

Avrute is a Bishop that has a jester-like appearance. He fought Dorothy in the fourth round of the War Games and was easily defeated. Rapunzel then kills him immediately for he is "too useless to even play rock paper scissors with."

Avrute's ÄRM consists of:

 Shelakey - A Weapon ÄRM in the shape of a large clawed gauntlet. It can supposedly cut through anything even other ÄRMs. Always spotted in activated form.

Kannochi
(カノッチ Kanotchi)

Kannochi is a Bishop who participates in the third round of the War Games where he had his nap until it was his turn. When it came to his turn, he faced off against Ginta. Kannochi uses Body Candle on Ginta which caused him to melt like a candle and even used his Dragon Rod to speed it up. Upon Ginta turning Babbo into Alice, Kannochi started to become affected by Body Candle and started to melt. Before melting fully, Kannochi gives Ginta some final words to encourage him to keep fighting, and warns him that from then on Team MÄR will be fighting the Knights, the true enemy.

Ginta later encountered a fake version of Kannochi in a fake version of Tokyo. After a brief fight, the fake Kannochi disappeared when the rest of Team MÄR disappeared.

Kannochi's ÄRM consists of:

 Body Candle - A Darkness ÄRM that links the target's bodily status to a burning candle, causing them to melt down as it does until there is nothing left. Should it fail, its own user will compensate for its usage by melting himself at a remarkably fast rate.
 Dragon Rod - Kannochi's cane Nature ÄRM engraved with the head of a dragon which breathes fire.

Maira
(マイラ)

Maira is a Bishop that wears a hooded robe and mask. He partook in the second round of the War Games where he fights Dorothy in the third match. He is defeated where he is sucked into the vortex within Toto's mouth, killing him.

Maira's ÄRM consists of:

 ??? - A weapon Ärm in the form of a scyth wielded by most Pawns, which Maira discarded after obtaining Vaqua. It only appeared in the anime.
 Vaqua - A Guardian ÄRM in the form of a giant blob of slime with one eye. The blob will digest anything it swallows up into its body (such as ÄRM or even enemies themselves) and will regenerate from any damage. It is destroyed by Dorothy's Toto (although Dorothy was hoping to add it to her collection).

Mr. Hook
(Mr.フック Fukku, "Captain Hook")

Mr. Hook is a Bishop who partakes in the third round of the War Games. He faces off against Snow and has a better advantage on the Volcano Field. Mr. Hook defeats Snow, but does not kill her since Diana still wants her.

In the fourth round, he faces off against Alviss who manages to defeat Mr. Hook without the use of any of his ÄRMs. Rapunzel then has Mr. Hook play Rock Paper Scissors for the fate of his life. Mr. Hook loses and is slashed by Rapunzel as Mr. Hook's body falls through the ice.

Mr. Hook's ÄRM consists of:

 Anger Anchor - A ring Weapon ÄRM which summons a giant anchor from the sky to crush enemies. It is what he used to defeat Snow, but it did not hit Alviss.
 Fishing Rod - A ring Weapon ÄRM in the form of a fishing pole which can fling people up into the air.
 Harpoon Cannon - A ring Weapon ÄRM that summons a giant harpoon.
 Screw Saber - The untwisted foil release of Mr. Hook's corkscrew-twisted bracelet Weapon ÄRM.

Orco
(オルコ Oruko)

Orco is a large barefoot Bishop who has a habit of underestimating his enemies. He was present at Phantom's revival. In the Chess Pieces' campaign for the War Games, Orco accompanied Girom in the attack on Vestry where he caused a lot of damages. Near the underground lake, Orco fought against Nanashi and Dorothy. Unfortunately for Orco, Nanashi easily defeats him when by pushing Orco into the water and using Electric Eye. Orco retreats and plans to return with more Chess Pieces only for him to run into Phantom (in his Tom disguise) who uses his Phantom Glass to kill Orco for showing his cowardice. Phantom then quotes for Orco to take his lessons from Ginta in the afterlife.

 Body Hardener - A Nature ÄRM. It is a set of armbands that can harden the user's body.

Rooks
(ルーク, Rūku) 
Rooks are the third strongest of the Chess Pieces after Bishops, they tend to be weak and more along the lines of above-average Pawns. Rook earrings are their insignia.

Loco
(ロコ Roko)

Loco is the strongest of the Rooks and one of the first Chess Pieces introduced. Loco's name means a patron of healers in the religion of Voodoo, a reference to her ÄRM Straw Doll (Spikes and Hammer). Loco was born 32 years before the main part of the series. At age 26, Loco, at that point a Pawn, the lowest Chess Piece rank, was given the order to participate in the attacking of an unknown town. While fighting, Loco's only ÄRM the Weapon ÄRM Ring Dagger, was broken, leaving Loco defenseless. While stumbling throughout the battling village, Loco crossed paths with a midget-like cloaked figure carrying a large suitcase. The cloaked person asked Loco if she wanted strength, to which she answered that she only wanted power to fight with. The cloaked person then gave Loco the suitcase, telling her it was full of seven Darkness ÄRMs, the cost of using being reversed aging (similar to Monster Girl), and the mysterious figure died from the ARM's effects. Using the Darkness ÄRMs, Loco eventually increased in the ranking system to the strongest of the Rooks. The Darkness ÄRMs affects had damaged her, however, as her body had been transformed into a young child's by the series' beginning when she was 58 years old.

Acting emotionless at all times, Loco finds little importance out of the happenings around her, and prefers to do anything that is seemingly the most successful path to take at the time. Loco's dark personality can also make her cruel at times. Unlike most other Chess Pieces, Loco does not wear her mask on her face (except at Phantom's revival), keeping it on her head's side instead. Loco is intelligent and wise, often being able to deduce problems quickly others find difficult or simply unsolvable. Loco also apparently does not enjoy sitting in the background doing nothing when given the chance to fight. Despite constantly being under her Darkness ÄRMs' curse, Loco sees little significance of her reversed aging, instead taking more concern with outside matters. Despite her young appearance and rather emotionless cover, inside she is still a mature woman. Loco is also very good friends with Chaton of the Bishops, despite how Loco is easily annoyed by Chaton. Chaton still remains unaffected by Loco's coldness, however, or rather, does not seem to understand how Loco is annoyed by this. Loco appears has a crush on the high-ranking Knight Halloween, keeping with her a small doll of the powerful Knight, as seen in the anime. Loco's appearance is often a common center of jokes throughout the series.

Loco first appeared during Phantom's revival, and was later sent to kidnap Snow alongside Ian, though before they could succeed (or get killed by Alan), Halloween ordered them back to Lestava Castle. She later appears during the 2nd Round of the War Games and fights Nanashi, nearly killing him with her Darkness ÄRM. Nanashi, however, breaks free and uses his Electric Eye to destroy the Darkness ÄRM's affects, though losses because he is unwilling to harm her prior to his falling unconscious from exhaustion. In the manga Loco makes only background appearance after this, though in the anime Loco, and later Chaton as well, act as important allies to Team MÄR, helping them rescue the Princess of Reginlief and escape the Ghost Chess. During the fight with the Ghost Chess, however, Loco's consistent use of her Darkness ÄRM ages her back into an infant, leading Chaton to take care of her.

At the end of the series, Chaton and Alan, who now live together, take care of the baby Loco together.

Loco keeps all of her ÄRMs in the suitcase strapped on her back. Her ÄRMs are:

 Animal Change - A torc ÄRM that metamorphoses people into animals which came into Loco's possession for a short period of time. It only appeared in the anime.
 Negzero - A pendant Darkness ÄRM that paralyzes the target, the side-effect is to reverse its user's aging.
 Ring Dagger - A ring Weapon ÄRM, transforms into a dagger. Loco had this ÄRM during the First Great War, but it was broken just before she gained the Darkness ÄRMs.
 Straw Doll (Spikes and Hammer) - A Darkness ÄRM in the shape of a straw man. Five metal stakes are hammered into ringed points on the straw man's body to damage the enemy in a Voodoo doll fashion. Using this ÄRM causes the user to decrease in age.

Additionally, Loco has five unknown Darkness ÄRMs that she has never been shown using. It is unknown if using the Darkness Ärm causes permanent de-aging, though more likely an age decrease through every use. If that's the case, the cost is a benefit by possibly increasing life span.

Leno
(レノ Reno)

Leno Rodokin is the son of Garon and Pano's brother, and the first enemy fought in the war games. He fought against Alviss who easily beat him. During Garon's battle with Ginta Toramizu, Leno believes it's all over once Garon's ÄRM are destroyed. Pano, however, reveals the truth to Leno, much to his surprise, as Leno finally learns what really brings strength.

He was killed by King (which left behind his mask). He was revived at the end watching Pano and Jack from afar with his father.

Leno is a Nature ÄRM user with his ÄRMs consisting of

 Flame Ball - A Nature ÄRM that creates balls of fire that float around the user that can be launched as projectiles or used to strengthen weapon ÄRM.
 Storm Kadarm - A Weapon ÄRM. It is a set of swords that attaches to the user's arms. These can act as both offensive and defensive weapons.

Pano
(パノ Pano)

Pano Rodokin is the sister of Leno and the daughter of Garon who is always barefoot and has bandage wrappings on her upper right arm and her lower left leg. Pano's most notable trait is her relationship with Jack, who she falls in love with during the series. She defeats him in the first round of the War Games, though loses to him during their rematch in the third. In both of her battles with Jack, at some point Jack is comically hit in the groin by Pano. Using Jack's mushrooms, it's discovered she's scared of bats, being immobilized, leeches, and likes pretty flowers and butterflies.

Pano first appeared with her family in the 1st Round of the War Games, where she managed to defeat Jack by hitting him in the groin with her Weapon ÄRM. Jack and Pano have a rematch in the 3rd Round, where Jack uses his mushrooms to force Pano to surrender. While under the effect of the mushrooms, Pano sees an absurdly handsome vision of Jack, and is quick to fall in love with him followed by a hug. Once the illusion is removed, however, Pano quickly becomes angry at Jack and kicks him in a very bad place....hard.

Pano later appeared during Jack's battle with Weasel, where she gave her support to Jack and encouraged him throughout the battle. By that time she seems to have developed a very big crush on Jack.

In the anime, she later reappeared stealing food where she reunites with several members of Team MÄR, including Jack, where she reveals King's mass murder of several Chess Pieces, including her brother and father. After King is defeated, Pano lives with Jack and his mother on their farm together, and it appears that her family supports her relationship with Jack.

Pano is a Weapon ÄRM user with her ÄRMs consisting of:

 Ball Hammer - Pano's mace Weapon ÄRM. Has a detachable ball head with radar skills to track down opponents and can separate into 4 sections to attack from different angles.

Alibaba
(アリババ Aribaba, "Ali Baba")

Alibaba is a Rook in a turban. He fights Alan in the first match of the third round of the war games. Alibaba is easily defeated and is thought to be killed by Alan who drops him into a volcano for his bragging and stuck-up personality.

Later on, Alibaba was actually saved by one of Phantom's ÄRMs and later resurfaced to kidnap the Princess Reginlief with the help of Fugi. Alibaba is defeated again through the efforts of Ginta Toramizu, Jack, and Loco and is presumed to be dead.

Once again, Alibaba turns up alive attending Carl and Princess Reginlief's wedding with Fugi.

Alibaba's ÄRM consist of:

 Genie's Lamp - A Guardian ÄRM in the shape of a lamp that releases a large green genie with a will of its own, that attacks with an apparent "mega punch". Alibaba claims that it is troublesome to control even for Knights, though this could be a retort on his part. This was destroyed by Alan. Alibaba later had another Genie's Lamp that contained a large red genie.

Fugi
(フーギ Fūgi)

A Rook who is the wind master. He is the first chess piece fought in round two where he fights Snow. He is defeated by her snowman Guardian ÄRM Yuki when it crushes him, but he is left alive.

Fugi later assisted Alibaba in kidnapping Princess Reginlief.

By the end of the anime, Fugi watches the wedding of Carl and Princess Reginlief as he is surpassed upon Alibaba turning up alive.

Fugi's ÄRM consist of:

 Vindalva - Nature ÄRM. Allows the user to control wind.

Garia
(ガリア)
Garia is a Rook in the Chess Pieces who wears a knight helmet. Garia was seen earlier in the series as a background character when Phantom plans to begin the campaign of the Second War Games. He is among the Rooks that joins Phantom in the attack on Caldia. Garia was easily defeated by Ginta.

Garia was among the Rooks who tried to prevent Team MÄR from reaching Snow. When Alan was killed by Caldia's Orb in the form of Danna, Chaton interrogated him about where Caldia's Orb is located.

Rondo
(ロンド)
 (English)

Rondo is a Rook who wears a headband that covers his right eye. He was present on Phantom's attack of Caldia and lost fighting Ginta who used Babbo's Bubble Launcher on him. When Phantom arrived, he urged him to kill Ginta which Phantom declined at since he wanted to fight Ginta when he's at his best.

Bols
(ボルス Borusu)
 (English)

Bols is a Rook who dresses up in a costume that almost resembles a strange Yeti-like creature. He was present on Phantom's attack on Caldia and lost fighting Ginta who used Babbo's Bubble Launcher on him. Bols was one of the Rooks who tried to prevent Team MÄR from reaching Snow in their rescue mission inside Lestava castle.

Kalerin
(カレリン Karerin)
Kalerin is a Rook who wears a strange mask decorated with geometric diamond. He was present on Phantom's attack of Caldia and lost fighting Ginta who used Babbo's Bubble Launcher on him. When Phantom arrived, he urged him to kill Ginta which Phantom declined at since he wanted to fight Ginta when he's at his best.

Pawns
(ポーン, Pōn) 
There are many Pawns in the Chess, and all but one (Gido) have not possessed individuality. Most are nameless and identical with black cloaks and masks. All Pawns are given a Weapon ÄRM, either a spear or two-blades that are attached to the user's arms.

Gido
(ギド)

Gido is Ian's girlfriend and the only Pawn of the Chess Pieces to have an individual identity. She accompanied Ian in his first battle against Ginta. When Ian is taken down, she holds her ground against the others until she is knocked down by Jack's attack. Due to Ian's loss to Ginta, Halloween had Ian punished by ordering Chimera to transform Gido into a creature with her body fused with tentacles, unable to speak as she transforms slowly into the hideous creature.

Eventually she is returned to her human form by Chimera's death and the couple leaves the Chess Pieces. In the anime afterwards, they meet up with Ash, who they quickly befriend, Ash dies protecting Ian and Gido from King, who return the favor by taking care of Ash's friends. Once Ash is revived, she and Ian continue to live with Ash and his kids.

Sub-Groups of the Chess Pieces

Zonnen
The Zonnens are an anime exclusive group which consists of psychopaths and bloodlusters of the Chess Pieces. Years prior to the current War, when the Chess Pieces army was in its heyday of bloodshed, among those converged towards its banner there was a group. Alone in this line of psychopaths and bloodlusters its members stood out as outstanding examples of barbarity - they found joy in that era of chaos, indulged themselves in abominable acts of abduction, decimation and destruction; and beheld the sight of ravage as a thing of absolute beauty. Their bestiality was of such that even Phantom revolted at their very presence; and far from being promoted, the group was estranged from the official military force and sent on a permanent residence in distant quarters. With the fall of Phantom and the Chess Pieces the group also decamped to oblivion; no effort to capture them has been answered ever since. That group was the gang of the Planets that revolves around the Evil Sun, Zonnen. After 6 years of anticipation, Phantom has resurrected, the Chess Pieces has risen, and with that the Zonnens have also returned. Having already been prejudiced against Phantom's way, they soon get impatient with his monotonous War Games and attempt on the lives of team Team MÄR to resume their savour in the war's bloody cycle. They attacked Team MÄR while they were in Alan's Training Gate.

Saturn

The leader of the Zonnen and the most vicious of the bunch. He immobilized Alan with his Darkness ÄRM Finsternis enabling the other Zonnen members to infiltrate the Training Gates. After the other Zonnen members were destroyed, Saturn attacked Alan as a last resort to trap the other members of Team MÄR. Alan had Merilo tell the others to transfer their power to Alan enabling Alan to break free. After Alan destroyed Finsternis, Saturn is metamorphosed into a one-horned wolf-like beast surrounded in a dark aura. Alan was able to open the Training Gates releasing Team MÄR. Saturn's beast form is then destroyed by the combined powers of Dorothy's Flying Leo, Snow's Yuki-chan, Alviss' 13 Totem Poles, Nanashi's Electric Eye, Jack's Earth Beans, and Ginta using Babbo's Gargoyle form.

Saturn's ÄRMs consists of:

 Eisenkugel - A one-ball chain-shot Weapon ÄRM.
 Finsternis - A Darkness ÄRM that paralyzes the opponent in a seemingly painful hold, requiring magic power equivalent to that of a Knight. If others step near the victim of this ÄRM, they will be pushed back and possibly knocked out. The compensation for this ÄRM is that when the ÄRM is destroyed, he will be transformed into a one-horned wolf-like beast surrounded in a dark aura.

Mars and Mercury
 Mars 
 Mercury 

Members of the Zonnen that attacked Ginta and Jack. They were destroyed by Ginta's Gargoyle.

Mars' ÄRM consists of

 Alcan Shield - Mars' ring Nature ÄRM which sets a rainbow rope about its target to limit movements/creates a mammoth rainbow-colored shield to fend off blasts

Mercury's ÄRM consist of:

 Astale Kuspus - Mercury's ring Weapon ÄRM. It is a set of seven swords darting at opponent at the whims of its user. When the final technique is commence, they will join together to form a giant shichishito.

Venus and Jupiter
 Venus 
 Jupiter 

Members of the Zonnen that attacked Alviss and Nanashi. They were destroyed by the combined powers of Alviss' and Nanashi's attacks.

Venus' ÄRM consists of:

 Arrow of Eros - Venus's Darkness ÄRM bow with arrows which, after shot, will inspire enmity even between best comrades.
 Goddess Tact - Venus's ring Weapon ÄRM that takes the form of a ribbon.

Jupiter's ÄRM consist of:

 Aerial Wall - Jupiter's bracelet Nature ÄRM which forms a green wall of thick air around the master, shielding him against outside assaults.
 Labyrinth - Jupiter's Dimension ÄRM which cages its victims inside an unfathomable labyrinth with walls that grow endless.

Uranus, Neptune, and Pluto
 Uranus 
 Neptune 
 Pluto 

Members of the Zonnen that attacked Dorothy and Snow. They were sent flying by the combined attacks of Dorothy and Snow.

Uranus ÄRM consists of:

 Education - A Dimension ÄRM. It is a giant collar.
 Lumiere Soleil - A Weapon ÄRM. It is a homing edged ball.
 Nachtfalter - A Guardian ÄRM that summons a giant moth which blows (presumably toxic) air with its wings.

Neptune ÄRM consists of:

 Rapture Shringe - A Dimension ÄRM. It is a giant bear-trap cage that rises from the ground.

Pluto ÄRM consists of:

 Lippenstift - A lipstick Dimension ÄRM with the ability to transform its user into an exact replica of the victim, and he/she will suffer all the injuries in the user's stead.

Ghost Chess
The Ghost Chess are an anime exclusive group which consists of Chess members who use Ghost ÄRMs. They appear in episode 85 to impede Team MÄR on their way to Phantom at Lestava castle. The leader, Kapel Meister transports Phantom to the distant fortress Pultgain and sends Team MÄR to a desert. During the subsequent fight with Ghost Chess member, Nanashi and Alan ends up being captured. Kapel Meister uses the Ghost ÄRM Rondo of Time to speed up the Zombie Tattoo on Alviss causing him to pledge loyalty and affection to Phantom. After Team MÄR manage to regroup, they fight Alviss and successfully brings him back to his senses. In a final effort to destroy them, Kapel Meister assimilates his teammates with a Ghost ÄRM and transforms himself into a monster, only to be defeated by Ginta.

Kapel Meister

Kapel Meister is the leader of the Ghost Chess. A Ghost ÄRM fanatic and admirer of Phantom, he blames Team MÄR and Ginta for Phantom's current depressed state. He seeks the legendary ÄRM of the sky castle Clavier in order to restore Phantom to his reign and usurps even the King and Queen. Using the Ghost ÄRM "The Rondo of Time", he accelerates Alviss' Zombie Tattoo and presents a mindwashed Alviss to Phantom, much to Rolan's chagrin. He is eventually destroyed by Ginta after he fuses with all of the Ghost Chess, excluding Sarah, into a huge monster.

Kapel's ÄRM consists of:

 Mekai No Analize - A Ghost ÄRM that turns the user into a massive dragon-like beast with venomous fangs.
 Rondo of Time - A pendant Ghost ÄRM that accelerates a process of a victims body, such as the spreading of Alviss' Zombie Tattoo.

Sarah Band

Sarah Band is the female vice-captain of the Ghost Chess who is loyal to Kapel Meister. In the final fight with Team MÄR, she uses a Ghost ÄRM with the ability to drain energy on them and ends up killing herself.

Sarah's ÄRM consists of:

 Ark Torff - A Ghost ÄRM turns the users hands into two bow-like constructs with demonic faces that absorb the magical power of enemies. If Ark Torff is countered, the user will rapidly age until they die.
 Scythe Hand - An unnamed Ghost ÄRM that turns the user's hands into scythe blades.
 Gemul Essen - A flower-like Ghost ÄRM pendant that is planted over the heart of a victim allowing the user to control their body.

The Flat Sisters
 Grave 
 Allegro 
 Moderato 

The Flat Sisters group of three sisters consisting of Grave, Allegro, and Moderato. Also extremely loyal to Kapel Meister, they even refer to him as 'big brother'. They die when assimilated by Kapel's Ghost ÄRM, which transforms him into a monster.

The Flat Sisters' ÄRMs consist of:

 Mess - A Ghost ÄRM that turns the user's hand into a sword blade.
 Rotkäppchen Waltzer - A Ghost ÄRM that combines A, B and C into a large Red Riding Hood-like guardian that uses physical and energy attacks. This form bears a strong resemblance to Akazukin Chacha.

General

General is a stalwart man who rarely speaks. He's Pause's partner. General dies when he is assimilated by Kapel Meister's Ghost ÄRM.

General's ÄRM consists of:

 Gegenzetsu - A Ghost ÄRM that turns one of the users forearms into an axe-like weapon. Depending on which side Verfile lands on, it can gain fire attributes.

Pause

Pause is a midget who accompanies General and acts the spokesperson for both. Pause dies when assimilated by Kapel Meister's Ghost ÄRM.

Pause's ÄRM consists of:

 Verfile - A Ghost ÄRM large dice that determines the form of Gegenzetsu when cast.

Other characters

Humans

Danna Toramizu
(虎水ダンナ, Toramizu Danna) 

Commonly known as "Boss", Danna is Ginta's father and the leader of the Cross Guard during the first War Games. Danna was obsessed with a "fantasy world" while in the human world, which he would later be taken into, and is both courageous and a role-model, though he is also very stubborn. All of these traits are shared by his son, and it is commented upon several times in the series their remarkable resemblance. He defeated Phantom in the Final Round of the original War Games, but was fatally wounded in the process. His body was later taken into usage by the King, and his soul was moved into Babbo. When the King is defeated, Ginta transfers his father's soul back into his body, and Danna is resurrected. At the end of the anime and manga, he leaves to return with his son Ginta to Earth world and his waiting wife.

Koyuki

Koyuki is Ginta's friend from Earth, who has often taken care of him. She is also Ginta's childhood friend, besides having a strong connection to Princess Snow. Not only does Koyuki look just like Snow, the two of them often see the each other's worlds through their dreams due to having a common soul. Koyuki uses her dreams to keep track of how Ginta is doing, and informs Mrs. Toramizu of Ginta's status in Mar. She also collects his schoolbooks and homework, and plans to make Ginta study hard when he gets back. As Snow's feelings towards Ginta grows, Koyuki shares Snow's romantic feelings as well, shown when she gets flustered and embarrassed when she tells Mrs Toramizu that Snow accidentally kisses Ginta. At the end of the series, Koyuki confronts her own feelings and clings onto Ginta upon his return to Earth under the falling snow.

Mrs. Toramizu

Mrs. Toramizu is Ginta's unnamed mom, who is an author of fantasy stories (which her missing husband and son are extremely interested in). Ginta's mother is a strong drinker and smoker, and also apparently has an interest in cooking unusual foods, once trying to make "pizza curry". In spite of her occupation, she stands a very practical viewpoint in matters regarding fantasized subjects, therefore tends to make light of her husband's, and later, her son's, passion for such. After Ginta's disappearance, however, she rues this dearly, thinking it was her fault that her family's gone and as Koyuki narrates Ginta's journey in MÄR-Heaven, she starts viewing fantasized subjects in a different perspective. It is later revealed that Diana watched Ginta's world through his mother's eyes in a manner similar to Snow with Koyuki. She is reunited with her husband Danna when he returns with Ginta.

Jack's Mom

The unnamed wife of the Cross Guard soldier Jake and mother of Jack. She resides on a small farm with her son and later the Rogelu Brothers. Jack is very close to her heart, especially after Jake was killed by the knight Weasel in the first War Games, and she at first discourages him to get in any fights with any opponent who may try to kill him, even if facing them is the right thing to do (when the werewolves were terrorizing their farm, she happily tolerated their cruel gorging for fear that Jack would get hurt if they tried to stand up for themselves). However, after Jack's triumph over the werewolves, and later during Jack's first match in the War Games she realizes that the time has come for Jack to become a man and that she should support him in this. One of her regrets is that while she taught Jack everything she knew about farming, she never taught him the proper way to treat a lady, and Jack is thus a little bit of a pervert. Jack's mother also takes Pano in hand and considers her like a daughter (or more like a daughter-in-law, as a wife for her son).

Jake

Father of Jack and a disciple of Gaira. In the previous War, heeding Gaira's summon, Jake left his family and went join the Cross Guard. During a fight in the War Game, he was killed by Weasel and his Battle Shovel was given to Jack.

Alma

Alma is a dead Vestrian female sailor whose ghost haunts Vestry's cave with her fellow crew, and also the only one among them to actually possess the ability of materialization into a ghostly human form.

Around 4 years before the 1st MÄR-Heaven war, Alma became Phantom's sweetheart until Phantom took on the Zombie Tattoo from his Queen, Diana. An argument soon broke out between the two, and as Alma realized she (and her viewpoint of life and humankind in general) could not shake his steadfast belief in the magnificence of immortality in the least, she bade Phantom farewell, never again met him. Alma and the crew of her ship died in the 1st War and, by the King of Chess Pieces himself, cursed to be wandering ghosts sealed inside the cave (in which approximately 2 years before she'd departed with Phantom) along with the Holy ÄRM Purific Ave it hid.

6 years later at the prelude of the 2nd War Game, Ginta's group arrived at Vestry and ventured into the cave to defeat the two Chess Bishops responsible for rampaging Vestry, Orco and Girom. Heeding their beg for freedom, after defeating Girom, Ginta cleared the blocked end of the cave, opening the way for the ship to depart. As a token of gratitude (and also in a hope to stop Phantom), Alma gave him one magic stone and the Purific Ave and ascended to heaven. Alma made a reappearance exclusive to the anime in the Ghost Chess attack, transporting Ginta and Dorothy back to Phantom's fortress after they were expelled out of there to her cave by the Ghost Chess. After the attack, she also appeared before Phantom and by assuring him he was not at all unloved, helped his soul achieve salvation before he died.

John Peach

John Peach is a boy with bandaged feet who fancies himself as the future great hero of MÄR, quite ignorant of his dim-witted and cowardly nature. He has a backpack of ÄRMs that are either too hard for him to use, very weak or do not work right. Hearing about the Chess raid in Vestry, he appeared there just after Ginta defeated Girom and challenged the boy for Team MÄR's leadership, which he lost miserably (as during each contest, just about every ÄRM he used backfired on him). When a group of thieves he had defeated (which was due to sheer dumb luck, since the Demon Tarantula ÄRM they used turned on them instead of him) appeared to take revenge on John Peach, he activated Demon Tarantula, only to had himself and his three friends nearly devoured by it, had it not been for Ginta's help. John Peach left before the Second War Games begun, and returned for once to cheer for MÄR in the Final Battles. He's seen at the end of the anime training with his three friends as he meditates under a waterfall.

Gaira

The 3rd man who fought in the 1st War Game 6 years ago alongside Danna and Alan, earning the Cross Guard their victory. He, however, loses to the Knight Chimera in the preliminary of the 2nd, and since then aids MÄR by training its inexperienced members. At the end of the anime, he was last seen attending the wedding of the Princess of Reginlief and Carl.

Princess Reginlief

Princess Reginlief is the host of the War Games. Fearing for her people's lives, she accedes to abiding by the Chess Pieces' wills and takes charges of the Games' preliminary round, later on in the first four rounds of casting the die to decide number of participants and battle locations. For this, Snow looks up to her as an inspirational figure of how the ruler must care for her subjects.

She is revealed to have a secret relationship with one of her soldiers, Carl, after he proves his manliness during Princess Reginlief's kidnap in the dungeon of Reginlief Castle, instigated by Alibaba and Fugi under orders from Phantom.

During the ending credits of the last episode, she and Carl, with several other guests attending, were seen getting married. Though their wedding was secretly watched by Fugi and Alibaba.

Caldia's Grand Elder

Caldia's Grand Elder is the most prominent figure of Caldia authority, always residing in the island's floating palace. As the elder he's ruthless when it comes to upholding Caldia's laws, having no apparent remorse when ordering family members to kill each other for the sake of redressing broken laws: 20 years ago it was he who urged Phantom's parents to execute their only son for having (almost) stolen the Orb, and it was also he who dispatched Dorothy to her one remaining relative, the older sister Diana's assassination for having absconded from Caldia with 798 of their ÄRMs. However, in cases when it's in Caldia's interest, he can be very resourceful and of great help: to aid team MÄR in their war against the Chess (which was, in particular, commanded by two of Caldia's outlaws Diana and Phantom and therefore part of the responsibility goes to Caldia), he's given them powerful Guardian ÄRMs and as the Final Battles concludes, appears before them to teach Ginta the true power of Purific Ave (which was to dispel Phantom's Zombie curse, ending his immortality).

In the anime when King and Queen attack Caldia's floating castle, he's morphed into a slimy giant and petrified when the curse is lifted by Babbo's Alice form. As King dies, everyone killed by him is revived, including the elder and he's seen talking to Caldian children in the ending credits.

Kotomi Tachibana

Kotomi Tachibana is Ginta and Koyuki's mutual childhood friend who died of an incurable medical condition while she was playing hide and seek with her friends. Ginta blamed himself for not being able to save Kotomi's life, as he believed that things would have panned out differently had he found her earlier. Ginta also tried his best to forget about Kotomi after she died which he eventually succeeds only to be reminded of this dark memory during his journey in the Earth fabricated from Ginta's memories.

Other creatures

Belle

Belle is a tiny fairy seen most of the times at Alviss' side. Belle befriended Alviss in his earlier years while he was training under Gaira's supervision and from then on has cherished a passion for him, which borders on monopolising crush: she cares for him a great deal, and gets jealous of whomever Alviss so much as behaves intimately to (which ranges from girls to friends, e.g. Alan). Belle and Edward host extras at the end of each episode that sums up the plot of each episode and lists the ÄRM Chess Pieces use in that episode. In the end of the anime, Alviss and Belle live happily ever after.

NOTE: She is named after Tinkerbell from Peter Pan.

Rogelu Brothers
 Garu Rogelu 
 Ruga Rogelu 

The Rogelu Brothers are two vegetarian werewolves that often steal vegetables from the garden of Jack's Mom. In the past, they have been thwarted by Jack's father Jake. The Rogelu Brothers were eventually defeated by Ginta and Jack.

During the events of the War Games, the Rogelu Brothers made amends with Jack's Mom and help her out with the farming in exchange for vegetables.

Edward

Edward is a cowardly humanoid dog who is Princess Snow's companion. After Alan fought to a draw against Halloween in the First War Games, Halloween used the Darkness ÄRM Igniel to merge Alan with Edward so that when Edward fell asleep three times, he would become Alan. But if Alan fell asleep just once, he would revert to Edward. They were later separated by Babbo's Alice form. Of course Edward's fear of cats would also carry over to Alan.

 Flying Carpet - A Dimension ÄRM that takes the form of a flying carpet. It often serves as a mode of transportation.

Burube, Torobe, and Garobe
Burube 
Torobe 
Garobe 

Burube, Torobe, and Garobe are three small creatures who are John Peach's companions who care very much for his safety. Burube is a small eggplant-shaped creature who carries on his back a book that details every known ÄRM, Torobe is a small red creature, and Garobe is a pink gelatinous creature that wears a witch's hat.

Pozun

Pozun is a small purple dwarf-like creature with a long tail. He is the judge of the War Games and is also in charge of explaining the rules as well as announcing when the War Games matches take place. He is hired by Chess, and has been the judge ever since the first War Games took place. After the War Games are over, Pozun gives Team Mar the Andata to Lestava Castle after Jack solves Pozun's village's water problems.

At the end of the anime, he is seen playing with his dwarf friends in a hot spring.

Porin
Porin is Pozun's younger sister.

Appearing in MÄR Omega
 Kai: An ÄRMsmith's fosterling who admires Ginta for his deeds in the 2nd MÄR-Heaven war. He always wants an ÄRM as powerful as Babbo, but is incapable of using any, as commented by his foster father, for his character is too hesitant. It later turns out Kai has very strong magical power, suggestive of his ancestral relation to the wizards. It is later revealed that he is a descendant of Babbo, which makes him able to wield Babbo. In reality, he is Babbo's son having been revived and sent to the future at the end of the war between Unwetter and Babbo.
 Babbo: The legendary ÄRM in the first two MÄR-Heaven wars, wielded by captain of MÄR, Ginta. Ever since the 2nd war concluded, he has been traveling around searching for Ginta, and ended up sleeping in a lake until Kai wakes him up. Babbo has no magic stone inserted, so he cannot transform into his previous versions. However, Babbo has new versions:
 Version 1 - "Needle Work": A centaur with a lance.
 Version 2 - "Hornet": A hornet that can separate to three parts.
 Version 3 - "Karadrio": A harpy that has healing powers.
 Version 4 - "Baron": A human type wearing an Oni mask. Does unarmed combat.
 Version 5 - "Behemoth": A hippopotamus that can swallow everything.
 Version 6 - "Nord Tortue": An absolute-defense turtle.
 Version 7 - "The Snow Queen": A Snow Queen.
 Version 8 - "Omega Gargoyle": Babbo's old Version 3 - Gargoyle that combines with Omega System.
 Elise: Kai's friend and also one of the sole escapees after the fake ÄRM user's attack on Kai's village, besides Kai himself. She's a cheerful, sweet girl, and promises to protect Kai in times of danger. It has currently been revealed that Dorothy had given her the nature ARM Fiori. The ARM contains the elements wind, fire, ice, and lightning. This ARM does not seem to have to much power to it, but according to Dorothy Elise's magic span should be enough to maintain it.
 Leon: Kai's friend, but one always has a bone to pick with the other, either by Leon teasing Kai for not having an ÄRM, or claiming himself to be stronger than Ginta, Kai's hero.
 Greda: A girl that lost her village, just like Kai. She was one of Artemis's underlings and killed by Artemis himself.
 Inga: Full name Inga Reed Unwetter, this young wizard boy is the descendant of Unwetter. One of his ARMs is a giant scythe-type weapon.

References

MÄR
Mar